This is a partial list of unnumbered minor planets for principal provisional designations assigned between 16 October and 15 November 2002. , a total of 644 bodies remain unnumbered for this period. Objects for this year are listed on the following pages: A–B · C · D–F · G–K · L–O · P · Qi · Qii · Ri · Rii · S · Ti · Tii · U–V and W–Y. Also see previous and next year.

U 

|- id="2002 UH1" bgcolor=#d6d6d6
| 0 ||  || MBA-O || 15.88 || 3.7 km || multiple || 2002–2021 || 12 May 2021 || 115 || align=left | Disc.: LPL/Spacewatch II || 
|- id="2002 UK1" bgcolor=#d6d6d6
| 0 ||  || MBA-O || 16.4 || 2.9 km || multiple || 2002–2021 || 14 Jan 2021 || 80 || align=left | Disc.: LPL/Spacewatch IIAlt.: 2016 CY88 || 
|- id="2002 UL1" bgcolor=#E9E9E9
| 0 ||  || MBA-M || 18.07 || 1.0 km || multiple || 2002–2021 || 07 Apr 2021 || 132 || align=left | Disc.: LPL/Spacewatch IIAlt.: 2008 EM45 || 
|- id="2002 UO1" bgcolor=#E9E9E9
| 0 ||  || MBA-M || 17.4 || 1.4 km || multiple || 2002–2020 || 19 Jan 2020 || 112 || align=left | Disc.: Tenagra II Obs. || 
|- id="2002 UP1" bgcolor=#E9E9E9
| 0 ||  || MBA-M || 17.4 || 1.4 km || multiple || 2002–2021 || 16 Jan 2021 || 130 || align=left | Disc.: Tenagra II Obs. || 
|- id="2002 UC2" bgcolor=#E9E9E9
| 0 ||  || MBA-M || 17.1 || 1.6 km || multiple || 2002–2021 || 18 Jan 2021 || 246 || align=left | Disc.: NEAT || 
|- id="2002 UJ2" bgcolor=#d6d6d6
| 0 ||  || MBA-O || 16.1 || 3.4 km || multiple || 2002–2021 || 07 Jan 2021 || 101 || align=left | Disc.: LINEAR || 
|- id="2002 UT3" bgcolor=#E9E9E9
| – ||  || MBA-M || 18.7 || data-sort-value="0.54" | 540 m || single || 20 days || 30 Oct 2002 || 9 || align=left | Disc.: NEAT || 
|- id="2002 UA4" bgcolor=#E9E9E9
| 0 ||  || MBA-M || 17.2 || 1.5 km || multiple || 2002–2021 || 14 Jan 2021 || 99 || align=left | Disc.: Tenagra II Obs.Alt.: 2015 VS89 || 
|- id="2002 UC4" bgcolor=#d6d6d6
| – ||  || MBA-O || 18.4 || 1.2 km || single || 4 days || 01 Nov 2002 || 11 || align=left | Disc.: Tenagra II Obs. || 
|- id="2002 UP4" bgcolor=#FA8072
| 0 ||  || MCA || 18.32 || data-sort-value="0.91" | 910 m || multiple || 2002–2019 || 24 Dec 2019 || 52 || align=left | Disc.: NEAT || 
|- id="2002 UY7" bgcolor=#d6d6d6
| 1 ||  || MBA-O || 16.5 || 2.8 km || multiple || 2002–2020 || 19 Jan 2020 || 66 || align=left | Disc.: NEAT || 
|- id="2002 UK9" bgcolor=#E9E9E9
| 0 ||  || MBA-M || 17.0 || 1.7 km || multiple || 2002–2021 || 18 Jan 2021 || 109 || align=left | Disc.: NEAT || 
|- id="2002 UV10" bgcolor=#FA8072
| 0 ||  || MCA || 18.4 || data-sort-value="0.62" | 620 m || multiple || 2002–2021 || 16 Jan 2021 || 97 || align=left | Disc.: NEAT || 
|- id="2002 UX10" bgcolor=#E9E9E9
| 0 ||  || MBA-M || 17.5 || 1.3 km || multiple || 2002–2020 || 22 Dec 2020 || 159 || align=left | Disc.: Kvistaberg Obs.Alt.: 2015 TB209 || 
|- id="2002 UE11" bgcolor=#fefefe
| 0 ||  || MBA-I || 18.86 || data-sort-value="0.50" | 500 m || multiple || 2000–2022 || 26 Jan 2022 || 45 || align=left | Disc.: Tenagra II Obs. || 
|- id="2002 UK11" bgcolor=#FFC2E0
| 0 ||  || APO || 21.89 || data-sort-value="0.15" | 150 m || multiple || 2002–2021 || 28 Jun 2021 || 76 || align=left | Disc.: NEATPotentially hazardous object || 
|- id="2002 UL11" bgcolor=#FFC2E0
| 5 ||  || AMO || 21.1 || data-sort-value="0.21" | 210 m || single || 57 days || 01 Dec 2002 || 46 || align=left | Disc.: NEAT || 
|- id="2002 UN11" bgcolor=#FA8072
| 0 ||  || MCA || 19.61 || data-sort-value="0.36" | 360 m || multiple || 2002–2021 || 30 Nov 2021 || 77 || align=left | Disc.: Whipple Obs. || 
|- id="2002 UR11" bgcolor=#E9E9E9
| 0 ||  || MBA-M || 16.2 || 2.4 km || multiple || 2002–2020 || 23 Dec 2020 || 172 || align=left | Disc.: NEAT || 
|- id="2002 US11" bgcolor=#fefefe
| 0 ||  || HUN || 19.27 || data-sort-value="0.42" | 420 m || multiple || 2002–2020 || 09 Nov 2020 || 32 || align=left | Disc.: Tenagra II Obs. || 
|- id="2002 UJ12" bgcolor=#FA8072
| – ||  || MCA || 18.2 || data-sort-value="0.68" | 680 m || single || 11 days || 06 Nov 2002 || 24 || align=left | Disc.: LINEAR || 
|- id="2002 UP12" bgcolor=#E9E9E9
| 1 ||  || MBA-M || 18.2 || data-sort-value="0.96" | 960 m || multiple || 2002–2020 || 23 Dec 2020 || 29 || align=left | Disc.: Tenagra II Obs. || 
|- id="2002 UQ12" bgcolor=#FFC2E0
| 0 ||  || APO || 22.2 || data-sort-value="0.13" | 130 m || multiple || 2002–2016 || 03 Nov 2016 || 130 || align=left | Disc.: LINEARAlt.: 2009 UH14 || 
|- id="2002 UR12" bgcolor=#E9E9E9
| 0 ||  || MBA-M || 16.1 || 3.4 km || multiple || 2002–2021 || 10 Jan 2021 || 182 || align=left | Disc.: AMOS || 
|- id="2002 UL13" bgcolor=#FA8072
| 0 ||  || MCA || 18.23 || data-sort-value="0.95" | 950 m || multiple || 2002–2020 || 21 Jan 2020 || 136 || align=left | Disc.: AMOS || 
|- id="2002 UW13" bgcolor=#E9E9E9
| 0 ||  || MBA-M || 17.36 || 1.4 km || multiple || 2002–2021 || 03 May 2021 || 247 || align=left | Disc.: NEATAlt.: 2012 BH21 || 
|- id="2002 UX13" bgcolor=#E9E9E9
| 2 ||  || MBA-M || 17.9 || data-sort-value="0.78" | 780 m || multiple || 2002–2018 || 08 Aug 2018 || 75 || align=left | Disc.: NEAT || 
|- id="2002 UC14" bgcolor=#d6d6d6
| 0 ||  || MBA-O || 16.5 || 2.8 km || multiple || 2002–2020 || 04 Jan 2020 || 111 || align=left | Disc.: NEAT || 
|- id="2002 UE14" bgcolor=#E9E9E9
| 0 ||  || MBA-M || 17.23 || 1.5 km || multiple || 2002–2021 || 12 May 2021 || 141 || align=left | Disc.: NEATAlt.: 2015 XW374 || 
|- id="2002 UM14" bgcolor=#E9E9E9
| 0 ||  || MBA-M || 17.29 || 1.0 km || multiple || 2002–2021 || 12 May 2021 || 99 || align=left | Disc.: NEATAlt.: 2010 JW92 || 
|- id="2002 UU14" bgcolor=#E9E9E9
| 0 ||  || MBA-M || 17.2 || 1.5 km || multiple || 2002–2019 || 02 Nov 2019 || 129 || align=left | Disc.: LINEARAlt.: 2015 TF233 || 
|- id="2002 UG16" bgcolor=#d6d6d6
| 0 ||  || MBA-O || 15.9 || 3.7 km || multiple || 2002–2021 || 16 Jan 2021 || 153 || align=left | Disc.: NEAT || 
|- id="2002 UB17" bgcolor=#E9E9E9
| 0 ||  || MBA-M || 17.7 || 1.6 km || multiple || 2002–2020 || 20 Dec 2020 || 186 || align=left | Disc.: NEATAlt.: 2011 SJ134 || 
|- id="2002 UF19" bgcolor=#fefefe
| 0 ||  || MBA-I || 17.58 || data-sort-value="0.91" | 910 m || multiple || 2002–2022 || 05 Jan 2022 || 225 || align=left | Disc.: AMOS || 
|- id="2002 UA21" bgcolor=#fefefe
| 0 ||  || MBA-I || 18.15 || data-sort-value="0.70" | 700 m || multiple || 2002–2021 || 15 Apr 2021 || 110 || align=left | Disc.: Kvistaberg Obs. || 
|- id="2002 US23" bgcolor=#fefefe
| 1 ||  || MBA-I || 18.0 || data-sort-value="0.75" | 750 m || multiple || 2002–2019 || 22 Jun 2019 || 73 || align=left | Disc.: NEATAlt.: 2009 UY26 || 
|- id="2002 UA24" bgcolor=#E9E9E9
| 1 ||  || MBA-M || 18.0 || data-sort-value="0.75" | 750 m || multiple || 2002–2020 || 23 Jan 2020 || 66 || align=left | Disc.: LPL/Spacewatch IIAlt.: 2014 OJ333 || 
|- id="2002 UR24" bgcolor=#E9E9E9
| 0 ||  || MBA-M || 17.34 || 1.4 km || multiple || 2002–2021 || 03 May 2021 || 140 || align=left | Disc.: LPL/Spacewatch IIAlt.: 2017 FF83 || 
|- id="2002 UK25" bgcolor=#d6d6d6
| 0 ||  || MBA-O || 16.70 || 2.5 km || multiple || 2002–2021 || 09 Apr 2021 || 130 || align=left | Disc.: AMOS || 
|- id="2002 UP25" bgcolor=#d6d6d6
| 0 ||  || MBA-O || 16.7 || 2.5 km || multiple || 2002–2021 || 17 Jan 2021 || 82 || align=left | Disc.: AMOSAlt.: 2014 WQ381 || 
|- id="2002 UQ25" bgcolor=#d6d6d6
| 1 ||  || MBA-O || 16.4 || 2.9 km || multiple || 2002–2018 || 06 Nov 2018 || 75 || align=left | Disc.: AMOS || 
|- id="2002 UD26" bgcolor=#E9E9E9
| 0 ||  || MBA-M || 17.39 || 1.4 km || multiple || 2002–2021 || 19 May 2021 || 168 || align=left | Disc.: LPL/Spacewatch IIAlt.: 2015 XP127 || 
|- id="2002 UG26" bgcolor=#d6d6d6
| 0 ||  || MBA-O || 15.57 || 4.3 km || multiple || 2001–2021 || 02 Apr 2021 || 257 || align=left | Disc.: LINEARAlt.: 2011 HC37 || 
|- id="2002 UR27" bgcolor=#E9E9E9
| 1 ||  || MBA-M || 16.8 || 1.8 km || multiple || 2002–2020 || 23 Jan 2020 || 170 || align=left | Disc.: NEATAlt.: 2010 HP61 || 
|- id="2002 UW29" bgcolor=#fefefe
| 0 ||  || MBA-I || 18.1 || data-sort-value="0.71" | 710 m || multiple || 2000–2020 || 21 Oct 2020 || 219 || align=left | Disc.: LPL/Spacewatch II || 
|- id="2002 UY29" bgcolor=#E9E9E9
| 0 ||  || MBA-M || 18.1 || 1.0 km || multiple || 2002–2021 || 18 Jan 2021 || 73 || align=left | Disc.: LPL/Spacewatch IIAlt.: 2013 HK137 || 
|- id="2002 UZ29" bgcolor=#E9E9E9
| 0 ||  || MBA-M || 17.8 || 1.2 km || multiple || 2002–2019 || 27 Oct 2019 || 145 || align=left | Disc.: LPL/Spacewatch IIAlt.: 2011 YQ29 || 
|- id="2002 UD30" bgcolor=#fefefe
| 0 ||  || MBA-I || 18.5 || data-sort-value="0.59" | 590 m || multiple || 2002–2021 || 10 Jan 2021 || 111 || align=left | Disc.: LPL/Spacewatch IIAlt.: 2009 SQ134 || 
|- id="2002 UH30" bgcolor=#d6d6d6
| 0 ||  || MBA-O || 16.29 || 3.1 km || multiple || 2002–2021 || 12 May 2021 || 98 || align=left | Disc.: LPL/Spacewatch IIAlt.: 2010 LS31 || 
|- id="2002 UK30" bgcolor=#d6d6d6
| 0 ||  || MBA-O || 17.34 || 1.9 km || multiple || 2002–2021 || 11 Sep 2021 || 49 || align=left | Disc.: LPL/Spacewatch IIAdded on 21 August 2021 || 
|- id="2002 UX34" bgcolor=#d6d6d6
| 0 ||  || HIL || 15.0 || 5.6 km || multiple || 2001–2019 || 07 Jan 2019 || 209 || align=left | Disc.: LINEARAlt.: 2008 KN32, 2009 OS8, 2015 HO47 || 
|- id="2002 UN35" bgcolor=#E9E9E9
| 0 ||  || MBA-M || 17.35 || 1.4 km || multiple || 2002–2021 || 27 Jun 2021 || 64 || align=left | Disc.: NEAT || 
|- id="2002 UN36" bgcolor=#E9E9E9
| 0 ||  || MBA-M || 17.3 || 1.5 km || multiple || 2001–2019 || 21 Dec 2019 || 102 || align=left | Disc.: NEATAlt.: 2006 QZ17 || 
|- id="2002 UP36" bgcolor=#d6d6d6
| 0 ||  || MBA-O || 16.5 || 2.8 km || multiple || 2002–2018 || 10 Dec 2018 || 52 || align=left | Disc.: LONEOS || 
|- id="2002 UV36" bgcolor=#FFC2E0
| 7 ||  || APO || 26.5 || data-sort-value="0.018" | 18 m || single || 14 days || 14 Nov 2002 || 31 || align=left | Disc.: LPL/Spacewatch II || 
|- id="2002 UA37" bgcolor=#E9E9E9
| 0 ||  || MBA-M || 17.45 || 1.4 km || multiple || 2002–2021 || 15 Apr 2021 || 190 || align=left | Disc.: NEATAlt.: 2011 YQ72 || 
|- id="2002 UE38" bgcolor=#fefefe
| 2 ||  || HUN || 18.8 || data-sort-value="0.52" | 520 m || multiple || 2002–2021 || 16 Jan 2021 || 37 || align=left | Disc.: La Palma Obs.Added on 17 January 2021 || 
|- id="2002 UK42" bgcolor=#E9E9E9
| 0 ||  || MBA-M || 17.84 || 1.5 km || multiple || 2002–2022 || 07 Jan 2022 || 105 || align=left | Disc.: LPL/Spacewatch IIAdded on 22 July 2020 || 
|- id="2002 UQ42" bgcolor=#d6d6d6
| 0 ||  || MBA-O || 17.26 || 2.0 km || multiple || 2002–2021 || 15 Apr 2021 || 106 || align=left | Disc.: LPL/Spacewatch IIAlt.: 2013 YD161, 2016 HN15 || 
|- id="2002 UW42" bgcolor=#fefefe
| 0 ||  || MBA-I || 18.46 || data-sort-value="0.60" | 600 m || multiple || 2002–2022 || 07 Jan 2022 || 61 || align=left | Disc.: LPL/Spacewatch IIAdded on 17 January 2021 || 
|- id="2002 UY42" bgcolor=#fefefe
| 0 ||  || MBA-I || 17.9 || data-sort-value="0.78" | 780 m || multiple || 2002–2020 || 16 Feb 2020 || 170 || align=left | Disc.: LPL/Spacewatch IIAlt.: 2012 TO197 || 
|- id="2002 UU43" bgcolor=#fefefe
| 0 ||  || MBA-I || 18.6 || data-sort-value="0.57" | 570 m || multiple || 2002–2020 || 14 Nov 2020 || 88 || align=left | Disc.: LPL/Spacewatch IIAlt.: 2009 QD62 || 
|- id="2002 UX43" bgcolor=#d6d6d6
| 0 ||  || MBA-O || 16.88 || 2.3 km || multiple || 2002–2021 || 11 May 2021 || 112 || align=left | Disc.: LPL/Spacewatch II || 
|- id="2002 UZ43" bgcolor=#fefefe
| 0 ||  || MBA-I || 18.22 || data-sort-value="0.67" | 670 m || multiple || 2002–2021 || 09 Dec 2021 || 106 || align=left | Disc.: LPL/Spacewatch IIAlt.: 2015 AB275 || 
|- id="2002 UJ44" bgcolor=#E9E9E9
| 1 ||  || MBA-M || 17.8 || 1.2 km || multiple || 2002–2019 || 24 Dec 2019 || 51 || align=left | Disc.: La Palma Obs.Alt.: 2002 VR148 || 
|- id="2002 UN47" bgcolor=#d6d6d6
| 0 ||  || MBA-O || 16.1 || 3.4 km || multiple || 2002–2020 || 23 Dec 2020 || 157 || align=left | Disc.: LINEARAlt.: 2012 LM3 || 
|- id="2002 UV47" bgcolor=#fefefe
| 0 ||  || MBA-I || 17.7 || data-sort-value="0.86" | 860 m || multiple || 2002–2020 || 20 Dec 2020 || 172 || align=left | Disc.: LONEOS || 
|- id="2002 UA50" bgcolor=#d6d6d6
| 0 ||  || MBA-O || 16.42 || 2.9 km || multiple || 2000–2021 || 12 Jun 2021 || 182 || align=left | Disc.: LPL/Spacewatch IIAlt.: 2011 LC13, 2015 BN567 || 
|- id="2002 UN50" bgcolor=#E9E9E9
| 0 ||  || MBA-M || 16.7 || 1.4 km || multiple || 2002–2021 || 13 Jan 2021 || 132 || align=left | Disc.: SDSS || 
|- id="2002 US50" bgcolor=#E9E9E9
| 1 ||  || MBA-M || 17.3 || 1.0 km || multiple || 2002–2020 || 29 Jan 2020 || 33 || align=left | Disc.: SDSS || 
|- id="2002 UW50" bgcolor=#E9E9E9
| 0 ||  || MBA-M || 17.14 || 1.6 km || multiple || 2002–2021 || 18 Jan 2021 || 198 || align=left | Disc.: SDSS || 
|- id="2002 UX50" bgcolor=#d6d6d6
| 0 ||  || MBA-O || 16.61 || 2.7 km || multiple || 2002–2022 || 06 Jan 2022 || 65 || align=left | Disc.: SDSS || 
|- id="2002 UL51" bgcolor=#d6d6d6
| 0 ||  || MBA-O || 16.84 || 2.4 km || multiple || 2002–2022 || 06 Jan 2022 || 52 || align=left | Disc.: SDSS || 
|- id="2002 UJ52" bgcolor=#E9E9E9
| 0 ||  || MBA-M || 17.0 || 1.7 km || multiple || 2002–2021 || 18 Jan 2021 || 136 || align=left | Disc.: SDSS || 
|- id="2002 UM52" bgcolor=#d6d6d6
| 0 ||  || MBA-O || 17.8 || 1.5 km || multiple || 2002–2021 || 04 Oct 2021 || 28 || align=left | Disc.: SDSSAdded on 5 November 2021 || 
|- id="2002 US52" bgcolor=#fefefe
| 0 ||  || MBA-I || 18.8 || data-sort-value="0.52" | 520 m || multiple || 2002–2021 || 12 Jun 2021 || 53 || align=left | Disc.: SDSSAlt.: 2012 XR61 || 
|- id="2002 UU52" bgcolor=#d6d6d6
| 0 ||  || MBA-O || 16.7 || 2.5 km || multiple || 2002–2019 || 04 Jan 2019 || 30 || align=left | Disc.: SDSSAlt.: 2013 YU137 || 
|- id="2002 UW52" bgcolor=#fefefe
| 0 ||  || MBA-I || 18.98 || data-sort-value="0.48" | 480 m || multiple || 2002–2021 || 07 Feb 2021 || 32 || align=left | Disc.: SDSS || 
|- id="2002 UX52" bgcolor=#E9E9E9
| 0 ||  || MBA-M || 17.82 || 1.5 km || multiple || 2002–2022 || 06 Jan 2022 || 58 || align=left | Disc.: SDSSAdded on 17 January 2021Alt.: 2014 HW193 || 
|- id="2002 UZ52" bgcolor=#E9E9E9
| 2 ||  || MBA-M || 19.1 || data-sort-value="0.45" | 450 m || multiple || 2002–2018 || 08 Aug 2018 || 18 || align=left | Disc.: SDSSAdded on 21 August 2021 || 
|- id="2002 UA53" bgcolor=#fefefe
| 0 ||  || MBA-I || 18.59 || data-sort-value="0.57" | 570 m || multiple || 2002–2021 || 15 Apr 2021 || 45 || align=left | Disc.: SDSSAdded on 22 July 2020 || 
|- id="2002 UG53" bgcolor=#d6d6d6
| 0 ||  || MBA-O || 17.04 || 2.2 km || multiple || 2002–2021 || 12 Sep 2021 || 173 || align=left | Disc.: SDSSAlt.: 2015 GJ40 || 
|- id="2002 UH53" bgcolor=#d6d6d6
| 0 ||  || MBA-O || 17.3 || 1.9 km || multiple || 2002–2019 || 28 Sep 2019 || 28 || align=left | Disc.: SDSS || 
|- id="2002 UK53" bgcolor=#E9E9E9
| 0 ||  || MBA-M || 17.4 || 1.4 km || multiple || 2002–2020 || 16 Nov 2020 || 89 || align=left | Disc.: SDSSAdded on 22 July 2020 || 
|- id="2002 UO53" bgcolor=#E9E9E9
| 0 ||  || MBA-M || 17.5 || 1.8 km || multiple || 2002–2020 || 06 Dec 2020 || 59 || align=left | Disc.: SDSSAdded on 22 July 2020 || 
|- id="2002 UU53" bgcolor=#fefefe
| 0 ||  || MBA-I || 18.8 || data-sort-value="0.52" | 520 m || multiple || 2002–2019 || 25 Jul 2019 || 69 || align=left | Disc.: SDSSAlt.: 2016 UG7 || 
|- id="2002 UC54" bgcolor=#fefefe
| 0 ||  || MBA-I || 18.7 || data-sort-value="0.54" | 540 m || multiple || 2002–2019 || 09 Apr 2019 || 40 || align=left | Disc.: SDSSAdded on 22 July 2020 || 
|- id="2002 UD54" bgcolor=#E9E9E9
| 0 ||  || MBA-M || 17.3 || 1.0 km || multiple || 2002–2021 || 14 Jun 2021 || 106 || align=left | Disc.: SDSSAlt.: 2013 JH43 || 
|- id="2002 UH54" bgcolor=#d6d6d6
| 0 ||  || MBA-O || 17.2 || 2.0 km || multiple || 2002–2021 || 15 Apr 2021 || 43 || align=left | Disc.: SDSSAdded on 21 August 2021Alt.: 2015 BN183 || 
|- id="2002 UP54" bgcolor=#E9E9E9
| 0 ||  || MBA-M || 17.97 || data-sort-value="0.76" | 760 m || multiple || 2002–2021 || 10 May 2021 || 70 || align=left | Disc.: SDSSAlt.: 2014 QR273 || 
|- id="2002 UQ54" bgcolor=#E9E9E9
| 1 ||  || MBA-M || 17.9 || 1.1 km || multiple || 2002–2019 || 02 Nov 2019 || 29 || align=left | Disc.: SDSSAdded on 22 July 2020Alt.: 2018 KT4 || 
|- id="2002 UT54" bgcolor=#E9E9E9
| 0 ||  || MBA-M || 17.90 || 1.5 km || multiple || 2002–2021 || 10 Nov 2021 || 38 || align=left | Disc.: SDSSAlt.: 2007 UV157 || 
|- id="2002 UW54" bgcolor=#E9E9E9
| 0 ||  || MBA-M || 17.4 || 1.8 km || multiple || 2002–2020 || 15 Oct 2020 || 82 || align=left | Disc.: SDSS || 
|- id="2002 UY54" bgcolor=#d6d6d6
| 1 ||  || MBA-O || 17.70 || 1.6 km || multiple || 2002–2021 || 05 Jul 2021 || 63 || align=left | Disc.: SDSSAlt.: 2012 TM92 || 
|- id="2002 UB55" bgcolor=#fefefe
| 0 ||  || MBA-I || 18.0 || data-sort-value="0.75" | 750 m || multiple || 2002–2021 || 11 Jan 2021 || 73 || align=left | Disc.: SDSS || 
|- id="2002 UD55" bgcolor=#E9E9E9
| 0 ||  || MBA-M || 17.13 || 2.1 km || multiple || 2002–2021 || 29 Nov 2021 || 139 || align=left | Disc.: SDSSAlt.: 2014 DV56 || 
|- id="2002 UG55" bgcolor=#E9E9E9
| 0 ||  || MBA-M || 17.35 || 1.9 km || multiple || 2002–2022 || 26 Jan 2022 || 149 || align=left | Disc.: SDSS || 
|- id="2002 US55" bgcolor=#E9E9E9
| 1 ||  || MBA-M || 18.0 || data-sort-value="0.75" | 750 m || multiple || 2002–2016 || 07 Jan 2016 || 28 || align=left | Disc.: SDSSAlt.: 2014 QJ280 || 
|- id="2002 UU55" bgcolor=#d6d6d6
| 0 ||  || MBA-O || 16.6 || 2.7 km || multiple || 2002–2020 || 01 Jan 2020 || 33 || align=left | Disc.: SDSS || 
|- id="2002 UE56" bgcolor=#E9E9E9
| 3 ||  || MBA-M || 19.0 || data-sort-value="0.47" | 470 m || single || 63 days || 07 Nov 2002 || 12 || align=left | Disc.: SDSS || 
|- id="2002 UH56" bgcolor=#E9E9E9
| 0 ||  || MBA-M || 18.3 || data-sort-value="0.65" | 650 m || multiple || 2001–2020 || 03 Jan 2020 || 30 || align=left | Disc.: SDSS || 
|- id="2002 UN56" bgcolor=#d6d6d6
| 2 ||  || MBA-O || 17.6 || 1.7 km || multiple || 2002–2019 || 04 Dec 2019 || 32 || align=left | Disc.: SDSS || 
|- id="2002 UP56" bgcolor=#d6d6d6
| 0 ||  || MBA-O || 16.5 || 2.8 km || multiple || 2002–2021 || 10 Jan 2021 || 93 || align=left | Disc.: SDSSAlt.: 2010 HO128 || 
|- id="2002 UR56" bgcolor=#E9E9E9
| 2 ||  || MBA-M || 17.88 || 1.1 km || multiple || 2002–2020 || 05 Dec 2020 || 23 || align=left | Disc.: SDSSAdded on 17 June 2021Alt.: 2020 VC23 || 
|- id="2002 UT56" bgcolor=#E9E9E9
| 2 ||  || MBA-M || 18.2 || data-sort-value="0.68" | 680 m || multiple || 2002–2014 || 01 Sep 2014 || 41 || align=left | Disc.: SDSSAlt.: 2014 QZ54 || 
|- id="2002 UU56" bgcolor=#d6d6d6
| 0 ||  || MBA-O || 16.7 || 2.5 km || multiple || 2002–2021 || 18 Jan 2021 || 51 || align=left | Disc.: SDSS || 
|- id="2002 UV56" bgcolor=#E9E9E9
| 1 ||  || MBA-M || 19.4 || data-sort-value="0.73" | 730 m || multiple || 2002–2020 || 21 Oct 2020 || 112 || align=left | Disc.: SDSS || 
|- id="2002 UB57" bgcolor=#d6d6d6
| 0 ||  || MBA-O || 16.8 || 2.4 km || multiple || 2002–2019 || 02 Nov 2019 || 43 || align=left | Disc.: SDSSAdded on 22 July 2020 || 
|- id="2002 UC57" bgcolor=#d6d6d6
| 0 ||  || MBA-O || 16.2 || 3.2 km || multiple || 2002–2021 || 15 Jan 2021 || 79 || align=left | Disc.: SDSSAlt.: 2010 JZ17 || 
|- id="2002 UJ57" bgcolor=#E9E9E9
| 0 ||  || MBA-M || 17.8 || 1.2 km || multiple || 2002–2021 || 18 Jan 2021 || 69 || align=left | Disc.: SDSS || 
|- id="2002 UP57" bgcolor=#d6d6d6
| 1 ||  || MBA-O || 17.54 || 1.7 km || multiple || 2002–2021 || 09 Aug 2021 || 49 || align=left | Disc.: SDSS || 
|- id="2002 UQ57" bgcolor=#d6d6d6
| 0 ||  || MBA-O || 16.4 || 2.9 km || multiple || 2002–2021 || 08 Jan 2021 || 82 || align=left | Disc.: SDSS || 
|- id="2002 UW57" bgcolor=#d6d6d6
| 2 ||  || MBA-O || 17.54 || 1.7 km || multiple || 2002-2022 || 15 Sep 2022 || 29 || align=left | Disc.: SDSS || 
|- id="2002 UZ57" bgcolor=#d6d6d6
| 1 ||  || MBA-O || 18.07 || 1.4 km || multiple || 2002–2017 || 20 Nov 2017 || 35 || align=left | Disc.: SDSSAdded on 22 July 2020 || 
|- id="2002 UE58" bgcolor=#d6d6d6
| 0 ||  || MBA-O || 17.5 || 1.8 km || multiple || 2002–2019 || 26 Nov 2019 || 28 || align=left | Disc.: SDSS || 
|- id="2002 UF58" bgcolor=#d6d6d6
| 0 ||  || MBA-O || 16.41 || 2.9 km || multiple || 2002–2021 || 12 May 2021 || 107 || align=left | Disc.: SDSSAlt.: 2015 BQ164 || 
|- id="2002 UH58" bgcolor=#E9E9E9
| 0 ||  || MBA-M || 17.50 || 1.8 km || multiple || 2002–2022 || 25 Jan 2022 || 115 || align=left | Disc.: SDSS || 
|- id="2002 UJ58" bgcolor=#fefefe
| 0 ||  || MBA-I || 18.07 || data-sort-value="0.72" | 720 m || multiple || 2002–2021 || 03 May 2021 || 75 || align=left | Disc.: SDSSAlt.: 2009 WC147 || 
|- id="2002 UM58" bgcolor=#d6d6d6
| 2 ||  || MBA-O || 18.3 || 1.2 km || multiple || 2002–2012 || 20 Nov 2012 || 20 || align=left | Disc.: SDSS || 
|- id="2002 UN58" bgcolor=#d6d6d6
| 0 ||  || MBA-O || 16.8 || 2.4 km || multiple || 2002–2019 || 21 Dec 2019 || 47 || align=left | Disc.: SDSSAdded on 22 July 2020Alt.: 2015 BC83 || 
|- id="2002 UQ58" bgcolor=#fefefe
| 0 ||  || MBA-I || 17.8 || data-sort-value="0.82" | 820 m || multiple || 2002–2018 || 13 Aug 2018 || 120 || align=left | Disc.: SDSSAlt.: 2011 KA24 || 
|- id="2002 US58" bgcolor=#fefefe
| 0 ||  || MBA-I || 17.93 || data-sort-value="0.77" | 770 m || multiple || 2002–2022 || 26 Jan 2022 || 101 || align=left | Disc.: SDSSAlt.: 2011 CJ13 || 
|- id="2002 UV58" bgcolor=#fefefe
| 0 ||  || MBA-I || 18.1 || data-sort-value="0.71" | 710 m || multiple || 2000–2019 || 28 Nov 2019 || 89 || align=left | Disc.: SDSSAlt.: 2002 TL313 || 
|- id="2002 UX58" bgcolor=#E9E9E9
| 0 ||  || MBA-M || 18.0 || data-sort-value="0.75" | 750 m || multiple || 2002–2020 || 14 Feb 2020 || 69 || align=left | Disc.: SDSSAlt.: 2006 QC73 || 
|- id="2002 UD59" bgcolor=#E9E9E9
| 0 ||  || MBA-M || 17.29 || 1.9 km || multiple || 2002–2022 || 27 Jan 2022 || 115 || align=left | Disc.: SDSS || 
|- id="2002 UH59" bgcolor=#d6d6d6
| 0 ||  || MBA-O || 17.1 || 2.1 km || multiple || 2002–2020 || 02 Feb 2020 || 62 || align=left | Disc.: SDSS || 
|- id="2002 UJ59" bgcolor=#d6d6d6
| 0 ||  || MBA-O || 16.54 || 2.7 km || multiple || 2002–2020 || 15 Feb 2020 || 109 || align=left | Disc.: SDSSAlt.: 2015 DM140 || 
|- id="2002 UK59" bgcolor=#d6d6d6
| 0 ||  || MBA-O || 16.7 || 2.5 km || multiple || 2002–2019 || 04 Nov 2019 || 64 || align=left | Disc.: SDSSAdded on 22 July 2020 || 
|- id="2002 UL59" bgcolor=#d6d6d6
| 0 ||  || MBA-O || 16.5 || 2.8 km || multiple || 2002–2021 || 17 Jan 2021 || 90 || align=left | Disc.: SDSS || 
|- id="2002 UM59" bgcolor=#d6d6d6
| 0 ||  || MBA-O || 17.0 || 2.2 km || multiple || 2002–2019 || 24 Dec 2019 || 34 || align=left | Disc.: SDSS || 
|- id="2002 US59" bgcolor=#d6d6d6
| 0 ||  || MBA-O || 17.1 || 2.1 km || multiple || 2002–2019 || 28 Oct 2019 || 54 || align=left | Disc.: SDSSAdded on 30 September 2021Alt.: 2013 RE8 || 
|- id="2002 UW59" bgcolor=#E9E9E9
| 1 ||  || MBA-M || 18.2 || 1.3 km || multiple || 2002–2020 || 23 Sep 2020 || 49 || align=left | Disc.: SDSSAlt.: 2011 SR251 || 
|- id="2002 UX59" bgcolor=#E9E9E9
| 2 ||  || MBA-M || 18.9 || data-sort-value="0.49" | 490 m || multiple || 2002–2020 || 27 Jan 2020 || 36 || align=left | Disc.: SDSSAdded on 22 July 2020 || 
|- id="2002 UY59" bgcolor=#fefefe
| 0 ||  || MBA-I || 17.4 || data-sort-value="0.98" | 980 m || multiple || 2002–2021 || 16 Jan 2021 || 114 || align=left | Disc.: SDSS || 
|- id="2002 UB60" bgcolor=#E9E9E9
| 0 ||  || MBA-M || 18.08 || data-sort-value="0.72" | 720 m || multiple || 2002–2020 || 22 Apr 2020 || 44 || align=left | Disc.: SDSSAdded on 24 December 2021 || 
|- id="2002 UJ60" bgcolor=#E9E9E9
| 0 ||  || MBA-M || 17.39 || 1.9 km || multiple || 2002–2022 || 26 Jan 2022 || 122 || align=left | Disc.: SDSS || 
|- id="2002 UM60" bgcolor=#E9E9E9
| 1 ||  || MBA-M || 18.70 || 1.0 km || multiple || 2002–2020 || 06 Dec 2020 || 17 || align=left | Disc.: SDSS || 
|- id="2002 UP60" bgcolor=#d6d6d6
| 0 ||  || MBA-O || 16.6 || 2.7 km || multiple || 2002–2021 || 18 Jan 2021 || 88 || align=left | Disc.: SDSS || 
|- id="2002 UT60" bgcolor=#E9E9E9
| 0 ||  || MBA-M || 17.39 || 1.9 km || multiple || 2002–2022 || 25 Jan 2022 || 44 || align=left | Disc.: SDSS || 
|- id="2002 UZ60" bgcolor=#E9E9E9
| 1 ||  || MBA-M || 17.5 || 1.3 km || multiple || 2002–2020 || 19 Jan 2020 || 35 || align=left | Disc.: SDSSAdded on 11 May 2021Alt.: 2019 TA56 || 
|- id="2002 UC61" bgcolor=#E9E9E9
| 0 ||  || MBA-M || 16.8 || 1.8 km || multiple || 2002–2021 || 07 Jan 2021 || 114 || align=left | Disc.: SDSSAlt.: 2011 UP165 || 
|- id="2002 UG61" bgcolor=#E9E9E9
| 1 ||  || MBA-M || 17.7 || data-sort-value="0.86" | 860 m || multiple || 2002–2020 || 04 Jan 2020 || 70 || align=left | Disc.: SDSS || 
|- id="2002 UP61" bgcolor=#fefefe
| 0 ||  || MBA-I || 18.4 || data-sort-value="0.62" | 620 m || multiple || 2002–2020 || 15 Dec 2020 || 109 || align=left | Disc.: SDSSAdded on 19 October 2020 || 
|- id="2002 US61" bgcolor=#E9E9E9
| 1 ||  || MBA-M || 18.2 || 1.3 km || multiple || 2002–2020 || 10 Nov 2020 || 106 || align=left | Disc.: SDSS || 
|- id="2002 UC62" bgcolor=#fefefe
| 0 ||  || MBA-I || 17.99 || data-sort-value="0.75" | 750 m || multiple || 2002–2022 || 24 Jan 2022 || 138 || align=left | Disc.: SDSSAlt.: 2013 TM61 || 
|- id="2002 UG62" bgcolor=#d6d6d6
| 0 ||  || MBA-O || 15.9 || 3.7 km || multiple || 2002–2019 || 29 Nov 2019 || 101 || align=left | Disc.: SDSS || 
|- id="2002 UJ62" bgcolor=#E9E9E9
| 0 ||  || MBA-M || 17.49 || 1.3 km || multiple || 2002–2021 || 07 Apr 2021 || 111 || align=left | Disc.: SDSS || 
|- id="2002 UM62" bgcolor=#d6d6d6
| 1 ||  || MBA-O || 17.1 || 2.1 km || multiple || 2002–2018 || 05 Oct 2018 || 26 || align=left | Disc.: SDSS || 
|- id="2002 UV62" bgcolor=#E9E9E9
| 0 ||  || MBA-M || 17.9 || 1.5 km || multiple || 2002–2020 || 06 Dec 2020 || 53 || align=left | Disc.: SDSSAdded on 19 October 2020 || 
|- id="2002 UL63" bgcolor=#E9E9E9
| 3 ||  || MBA-M || 19.6 || data-sort-value="0.36" | 360 m || multiple || 2002–2019 || 28 Dec 2019 || 24 || align=left | Disc.: SDSSAdded on 22 July 2020 || 
|- id="2002 UQ63" bgcolor=#fefefe
| 1 ||  || MBA-I || 19.4 || data-sort-value="0.39" | 390 m || multiple || 2002–2019 || 27 Oct 2019 || 51 || align=left | Disc.: SDSS || 
|- id="2002 UV63" bgcolor=#d6d6d6
| 3 ||  || MBA-O || 17.9 || 1.5 km || multiple || 2002–2019 || 25 Oct 2019 || 36 || align=left | Disc.: SDSSAdded on 22 July 2020Alt.: 2019 QO19 || 
|- id="2002 UW63" bgcolor=#fefefe
| 0 ||  || MBA-I || 18.1 || data-sort-value="0.71" | 710 m || multiple || 2002–2021 || 06 Jan 2021 || 61 || align=left | Disc.: SDSS || 
|- id="2002 UK64" bgcolor=#fefefe
| 0 ||  || MBA-I || 19.13 || data-sort-value="0.44" | 440 m || multiple || 2002–2022 || 25 Jan 2022 || 41 || align=left | Disc.: SDSSAdded on 22 July 2020 || 
|- id="2002 US64" bgcolor=#fefefe
| 1 ||  || HUN || 18.7 || data-sort-value="0.54" | 540 m || multiple || 2002–2020 || 17 Nov 2020 || 55 || align=left | Disc.: SDSSAdded on 17 January 2021 || 
|- id="2002 UV64" bgcolor=#E9E9E9
| 1 ||  || MBA-M || 17.98 || data-sort-value="0.75" | 750 m || multiple || 2002–2021 || 09 Apr 2021 || 22 || align=left | Disc.: SDSS || 
|- id="2002 UB65" bgcolor=#E9E9E9
| 1 ||  || MBA-M || 18.3 || data-sort-value="0.92" | 920 m || multiple || 2002–2019 || 05 Nov 2019 || 50 || align=left | Disc.: SDSS || 
|- id="2002 UC65" bgcolor=#d6d6d6
| 0 ||  || MBA-O || 17.06 || 2.2 km || multiple || 2002–2021 || 08 May 2021 || 48 || align=left | Disc.: SDSSAdded on 17 January 2021Alt.: 2015 FR380 || 
|- id="2002 UK65" bgcolor=#fefefe
| 0 ||  || MBA-I || 18.03 || data-sort-value="0.74" | 740 m || multiple || 2002–2022 || 27 Jan 2022 || 79 || align=left | Disc.: SDSS || 
|- id="2002 UQ65" bgcolor=#E9E9E9
| 0 ||  || MBA-M || 17.8 || 1.2 km || multiple || 2002–2021 || 07 Jan 2021 || 58 || align=left | Disc.: SDSSAlt.: 2015 UU39 || 
|- id="2002 UT65" bgcolor=#d6d6d6
| 1 ||  || MBA-O || 16.9 || 2.3 km || multiple || 2002–2018 || 09 Nov 2018 || 27 || align=left | Disc.: SDSSAdded on 19 October 2020 || 
|- id="2002 UU65" bgcolor=#d6d6d6
| 0 ||  || MBA-O || 16.8 || 2.4 km || multiple || 2002–2020 || 24 Jan 2020 || 61 || align=left | Disc.: SDSS || 
|- id="2002 UY65" bgcolor=#d6d6d6
| 0 ||  || MBA-O || 16.9 || 2.3 km || multiple || 2002–2020 || 24 Jan 2020 || 45 || align=left | Disc.: SDSS || 
|- id="2002 UK66" bgcolor=#d6d6d6
| 2 ||  || MBA-O || 17.8 || 1.5 km || multiple || 2002–2018 || 18 Oct 2018 || 19 || align=left | Disc.: SDSSAdded on 21 August 2021 || 
|- id="2002 UP66" bgcolor=#fefefe
| 0 ||  || MBA-I || 17.5 || data-sort-value="0.94" | 940 m || multiple || 2002–2020 || 05 Dec 2020 || 216 || align=left | Disc.: SDSSAlt.: 2013 VT5 || 
|- id="2002 UZ66" bgcolor=#d6d6d6
| 0 ||  || MBA-O || 17.1 || 2.1 km || multiple || 2002–2018 || 18 Oct 2018 || 35 || align=left | Disc.: SDSS || 
|- id="2002 UE67" bgcolor=#E9E9E9
| 0 ||  || MBA-M || 17.6 || 1.3 km || multiple || 2002–2021 || 12 Jan 2021 || 76 || align=left | Disc.: SDSS || 
|- id="2002 UF67" bgcolor=#fefefe
| 1 ||  || MBA-I || 19.0 || data-sort-value="0.47" | 470 m || multiple || 2002–2021 || 07 Feb 2021 || 30 || align=left | Disc.: SDSSAdded on 11 May 2021 || 
|- id="2002 UG67" bgcolor=#E9E9E9
| 0 ||  || MBA-M || 17.72 || 1.6 km || multiple || 2000–2022 || 25 Jan 2022 || 89 || align=left | Disc.: SDSSAlt.: 2015 PO132 || 
|- id="2002 UL67" bgcolor=#FA8072
| – ||  || MCA || 20.4 || data-sort-value="0.25" | 250 m || single || 22 days || 31 Oct 2002 || 8 || align=left | Disc.: SDSS || 
|- id="2002 UN67" bgcolor=#d6d6d6
| 0 ||  || MBA-O || 16.7 || 2.5 km || multiple || 2002–2020 || 14 Jan 2020 || 45 || align=left | Disc.: SDSSAdded on 22 July 2020Alt.: 2015 AW268 || 
|- id="2002 UO67" bgcolor=#E9E9E9
| 0 ||  || MBA-M || 17.78 || 1.5 km || multiple || 2002–2022 || 25 Jan 2022 || 57 || align=left | Disc.: SDSS || 
|- id="2002 UB68" bgcolor=#E9E9E9
| 2 ||  || MBA-M || 18.8 || data-sort-value="0.52" | 520 m || multiple || 2002–2018 || 01 Nov 2018 || 25 || align=left | Disc.: SDSSAdded on 21 August 2021 || 
|- id="2002 UF68" bgcolor=#d6d6d6
| 0 ||  || MBA-O || 16.23 || 3.2 km || multiple || 2002–2022 || 27 Jan 2022 || 102 || align=left | Disc.: SDSS || 
|- id="2002 UH68" bgcolor=#E9E9E9
| 0 ||  || MBA-M || 18.5 || data-sort-value="0.84" | 840 m || multiple || 2002–2019 || 27 Oct 2019 || 49 || align=left | Disc.: SDSSAdded on 22 July 2020Alt.: 2019 QE30 || 
|- id="2002 UK68" bgcolor=#E9E9E9
| – ||  || MBA-M || 18.5 || 1.1 km || single || 20 days || 31 Oct 2002 || 6 || align=left | Disc.: SDSS || 
|- id="2002 UM68" bgcolor=#fefefe
| 0 ||  || MBA-I || 19.20 || data-sort-value="0.43" | 430 m || multiple || 2002–2021 || 06 Oct 2021 || 182 || align=left | Disc.: SDSSAlt.: 2015 BD479 || 
|- id="2002 UW68" bgcolor=#E9E9E9
| 2 ||  || MBA-M || 18.4 || 1.2 km || multiple || 2002–2020 || 17 Sep 2020 || 23 || align=left | Disc.: SDSSAdded on 17 January 2021 || 
|- id="2002 UX68" bgcolor=#E9E9E9
| 0 ||  || MBA-M || 18.05 || data-sort-value="0.73" | 730 m || multiple || 2002–2021 || 14 Apr 2021 || 46 || align=left | Disc.: SDSSAdded on 22 July 2020 || 
|- id="2002 UZ68" bgcolor=#E9E9E9
| 1 ||  || MBA-M || 19.1 || data-sort-value="0.64" | 640 m || multiple || 2002–2019 || 25 Sep 2019 || 337 || align=left | Disc.: SDSSAdded on 19 October 2020Alt.: 2015 XE23 || 
|- id="2002 UC69" bgcolor=#E9E9E9
| 0 ||  || MBA-M || 18.16 || 1.3 km || multiple || 2002–2022 || 06 Jan 2022 || 25 || align=left | Disc.: SDSS || 
|- id="2002 UE69" bgcolor=#fefefe
| 1 ||  || HUN || 18.6 || data-sort-value="0.57" | 570 m || multiple || 2002–2020 || 27 Jan 2020 || 25 || align=left | Disc.: SDSSAdded on 17 January 2021Alt.: 2015 FA425 || 
|- id="2002 UF69" bgcolor=#d6d6d6
| 0 ||  || MBA-O || 17.4 || 1.8 km || multiple || 2002–2021 || 07 Jan 2021 || 29 || align=left | Disc.: SDSS || 
|- id="2002 UG69" bgcolor=#fefefe
| 0 ||  || MBA-I || 18.7 || data-sort-value="0.54" | 540 m || multiple || 2002–2020 || 16 Nov 2020 || 63 || align=left | Disc.: SDSS || 
|- id="2002 UJ69" bgcolor=#d6d6d6
| 0 ||  || MBA-O || 16.85 || 2.4 km || multiple || 2002–2021 || 19 Apr 2021 || 58 || align=left | Disc.: SDSSAlt.: 2015 DO200 || 
|- id="2002 UM69" bgcolor=#E9E9E9
| 0 ||  || MBA-M || 17.2 || 1.5 km || multiple || 2002–2020 || 10 Dec 2020 || 80 || align=left | Disc.: SDSS || 
|- id="2002 UP69" bgcolor=#d6d6d6
| 0 ||  || MBA-O || 17.60 || 1.7 km || multiple || 2002–2020 || 17 Apr 2020 || 47 || align=left | Disc.: SDSSAdded on 21 August 2021 || 
|- id="2002 UQ69" bgcolor=#E9E9E9
| 0 ||  || MBA-M || 17.64 || 1.7 km || multiple || 2002–2021 || 02 Dec 2021 || 58 || align=left | Disc.: SDSS || 
|- id="2002 UY69" bgcolor=#E9E9E9
| 0 ||  || MBA-M || 17.4 || 1.8 km || multiple || 2002–2021 || 30 Nov 2021 || 88 || align=left | Disc.: George Obs. || 
|- id="2002 UH70" bgcolor=#d6d6d6
| 0 ||  || MBA-O || 16.84 || 2.4 km || multiple || 2002–2021 || 06 Apr 2021 || 134 || align=left | Disc.: NEAT || 
|- id="2002 UL70" bgcolor=#E9E9E9
| 0 ||  || MBA-M || 17.54 || 1.7 km || multiple || 2002–2022 || 27 Jan 2022 || 94 || align=left | Disc.: NEAT || 
|- id="2002 UB71" bgcolor=#E9E9E9
| 0 ||  || MBA-M || 16.8 || 1.8 km || multiple || 2002–2021 || 16 Jan 2021 || 130 || align=left | Disc.: NEATAlt.: 2011 WL145 || 
|- id="2002 UE71" bgcolor=#E9E9E9
| 0 ||  || MBA-M || 18.5 || data-sort-value="0.59" | 590 m || multiple || 2002–2021 || 11 May 2021 || 126 || align=left | Disc.: NEAT || 
|- id="2002 UR71" bgcolor=#fefefe
| 0 ||  || MBA-I || 17.7 || data-sort-value="0.86" | 860 m || multiple || 2002–2019 || 19 Dec 2019 || 117 || align=left | Disc.: NEATAlt.: 2012 RA41 || 
|- id="2002 US71" bgcolor=#E9E9E9
| 0 ||  || MBA-M || 17.0 || 2.2 km || multiple || 2002–2021 || 15 Jan 2021 || 211 || align=left | Disc.: NEATAlt.: 2005 LR52, 2011 UB100 || 
|- id="2002 UA72" bgcolor=#fefefe
| 0 ||  || MBA-I || 18.2 || data-sort-value="0.68" | 680 m || multiple || 1998–2020 || 11 Oct 2020 || 99 || align=left | Disc.: NEAT || 
|- id="2002 UD72" bgcolor=#E9E9E9
| 0 ||  || MBA-M || 17.46 || 1.8 km || multiple || 2002–2022 || 27 Jan 2022 || 98 || align=left | Disc.: NEATAlt.: 2016 XJ6 || 
|- id="2002 UU72" bgcolor=#E9E9E9
| 0 ||  || MBA-M || 17.3 || 1.5 km || multiple || 2002–2021 || 17 Jan 2021 || 161 || align=left | Disc.: NEATAlt.: 2015 TY150 || 
|- id="2002 UD73" bgcolor=#d6d6d6
| 1 ||  || MBA-O || 16.7 || 2.5 km || multiple || 2002–2020 || 13 May 2020 || 75 || align=left | Disc.: NEATAlt.: 2007 VK319 || 
|- id="2002 UH73" bgcolor=#E9E9E9
| 0 ||  || MBA-M || 17.2 || 1.5 km || multiple || 2002–2018 || 07 Mar 2018 || 37 || align=left | Disc.: NEATAdded on 29 January 2022 || 
|- id="2002 UJ73" bgcolor=#fefefe
| 0 ||  || MBA-I || 18.65 || data-sort-value="0.55" | 550 m || multiple || 2002–2021 || 27 Oct 2021 || 74 || align=left | Disc.: NEAT || 
|- id="2002 UK73" bgcolor=#fefefe
| – ||  || MBA-I || 19.3 || data-sort-value="0.41" | 410 m || single || 5 days || 03 Nov 2002 || 9 || align=left | Disc.: NEAT || 
|- id="2002 UM73" bgcolor=#d6d6d6
| 0 ||  || MBA-O || 16.99 || 2.2 km || multiple || 2002–2021 || 12 May 2021 || 90 || align=left | Disc.: NEATAlt.: 2007 RO53, 2015 FJ177 || 
|- id="2002 US73" bgcolor=#fefefe
| 1 ||  || MBA-I || 18.6 || data-sort-value="0.57" | 570 m || multiple || 2001–2019 || 04 Oct 2019 || 60 || align=left | Disc.: NEAT || 
|- id="2002 UT73" bgcolor=#d6d6d6
| 0 ||  || MBA-O || 17.0 || 2.2 km || multiple || 2002–2018 || 13 Sep 2018 || 50 || align=left | Disc.: NEAT || 
|- id="2002 UU73" bgcolor=#d6d6d6
| 0 ||  || HIL || 15.5 || 4.4 km || multiple || 2001–2018 || 29 Nov 2018 || 98 || align=left | Disc.: NEAT || 
|- id="2002 UV73" bgcolor=#E9E9E9
| 0 ||  || MBA-M || 17.7 || data-sort-value="0.86" | 860 m || multiple || 2002–2020 || 26 Jan 2020 || 57 || align=left | Disc.: NEATAlt.: 2014 QG285 || 
|- id="2002 UW73" bgcolor=#fefefe
| 1 ||  || MBA-I || 19.1 || data-sort-value="0.45" | 450 m || multiple || 2002–2020 || 21 Jan 2020 || 36 || align=left | Disc.: NEAT || 
|- id="2002 UX73" bgcolor=#fefefe
| 1 ||  || MBA-I || 19.91 || data-sort-value="0.31" | 310 m || multiple || 2002–2020 || 16 Nov 2020 || 38 || align=left | Disc.: NEATAdded on 17 January 2021 || 
|- id="2002 UY73" bgcolor=#fefefe
| 1 ||  || MBA-I || 19.2 || data-sort-value="0.43" | 430 m || multiple || 1995–2020 || 24 Dec 2020 || 42 || align=left | Disc.: SpacewatchAlt.: 1995 VT5, 2009 SS142 || 
|- id="2002 UF74" bgcolor=#fefefe
| 2 ||  || MBA-I || 18.8 || data-sort-value="0.52" | 520 m || multiple || 2002–2017 || 25 Dec 2017 || 28 || align=left | Disc.: NEAT || 
|- id="2002 UG74" bgcolor=#E9E9E9
| 0 ||  || MBA-M || 17.2 || 2.0 km || multiple || 2002–2021 || 05 Jan 2021 || 178 || align=left | Disc.: NEATAlt.: 2011 SL187 || 
|- id="2002 UL74" bgcolor=#d6d6d6
| 0 ||  || MBA-O || 16.84 || 2.4 km || multiple || 2002–2020 || 21 Dec 2020 || 63 || align=left | Disc.: NEATAlt.: 2019 SY19 || 
|- id="2002 US74" bgcolor=#E9E9E9
| 0 ||  || MBA-M || 16.4 || 2.2 km || multiple || 1993–2021 || 08 Jan 2021 || 224 || align=left | Disc.: NEAT || 
|- id="2002 UV74" bgcolor=#E9E9E9
| 0 ||  || MBA-M || 17.1 || 2.1 km || multiple || 2002–2021 || 16 Jan 2021 || 149 || align=left | Disc.: NEATAlt.: 2011 WH37 || 
|- id="2002 UX74" bgcolor=#fefefe
| 0 ||  || MBA-I || 17.2 || 1.1 km || multiple || 2002–2021 || 16 Jan 2021 || 152 || align=left | Disc.: NEAT || 
|- id="2002 UB75" bgcolor=#E9E9E9
| 0 ||  || MBA-M || 17.4 || 1.4 km || multiple || 2002–2020 || 11 Dec 2020 || 47 || align=left | Disc.: NEAT || 
|- id="2002 UC75" bgcolor=#d6d6d6
| 0 ||  || MBA-O || 16.4 || 2.9 km || multiple || 2002–2019 || 23 Oct 2019 || 55 || align=left | Disc.: NEAT || 
|- id="2002 UD75" bgcolor=#fefefe
| 0 ||  || MBA-I || 18.0 || data-sort-value="0.75" | 750 m || multiple || 2002–2021 || 15 Jun 2021 || 160 || align=left | Disc.: NEATAlt.: 2012 XK48 || 
|- id="2002 UE75" bgcolor=#E9E9E9
| 0 ||  || MBA-M || 17.5 || data-sort-value="0.94" | 940 m || multiple || 2002–2020 || 25 Jan 2020 || 112 || align=left | Disc.: NEAT || 
|- id="2002 UK75" bgcolor=#d6d6d6
| 0 ||  || MBA-O || 16.30 || 3.1 km || multiple || 2002–2021 || 02 May 2021 || 216 || align=left | Disc.: NEAT || 
|- id="2002 UM75" bgcolor=#fefefe
| 0 ||  || MBA-I || 18.0 || data-sort-value="0.75" | 750 m || multiple || 2001–2021 || 08 Jan 2021 || 112 || align=left | Disc.: NEAT || 
|- id="2002 UQ75" bgcolor=#FA8072
| 1 ||  || HUN || 18.9 || data-sort-value="0.49" | 490 m || multiple || 2002–2021 || 15 Jan 2021 || 54 || align=left | Disc.: NEAT || 
|- id="2002 UR75" bgcolor=#fefefe
| 0 ||  || MBA-I || 18.57 || data-sort-value="0.57" | 570 m || multiple || 2002–2021 || 14 Apr 2021 || 59 || align=left | Disc.: NEAT || 
|- id="2002 UT75" bgcolor=#E9E9E9
| 0 ||  || MBA-M || 17.14 || 1.6 km || multiple || 2002–2021 || 17 Apr 2021 || 184 || align=left | Disc.: NEAT || 
|- id="2002 UU75" bgcolor=#d6d6d6
| 0 ||  || MBA-O || 15.9 || 3.7 km || multiple || 2002–2020 || 20 Dec 2020 || 86 || align=left | Disc.: NEAT || 
|- id="2002 UX75" bgcolor=#d6d6d6
| 1 ||  || MBA-O || 17.9 || 1.5 km || multiple || 2002–2019 || 08 Jan 2019 || 38 || align=left | Disc.: NEAT || 
|- id="2002 UD76" bgcolor=#E9E9E9
| 0 ||  || MBA-M || 17.6 || 1.3 km || multiple || 2002–2021 || 18 Jan 2021 || 81 || align=left | Disc.: SDSS || 
|- id="2002 UF76" bgcolor=#d6d6d6
| 0 ||  || MBA-O || 16.86 || 2.4 km || multiple || 2002–2021 || 07 Jul 2021 || 116 || align=left | Disc.: SDSSAlt.: 2015 HY53 || 
|- id="2002 UM76" bgcolor=#E9E9E9
| 0 ||  || MBA-M || 18.07 || 1.4 km || multiple || 2002–2022 || 25 Jan 2022 || 56 || align=left | Disc.: SDSSAdded on 19 October 2020 || 
|- id="2002 UV76" bgcolor=#E9E9E9
| – ||  || MBA-M || 17.3 || 1.9 km || single || 41 days || 10 Dec 2002 || 11 || align=left | Disc.: AMOS || 
|- id="2002 UW76" bgcolor=#E9E9E9
| 0 ||  || MBA-M || 17.54 || data-sort-value="0.92" | 920 m || multiple || 2002–2021 || 05 Jul 2021 || 153 || align=left | Disc.: NEAT || 
|- id="2002 UX76" bgcolor=#fefefe
| 0 ||  || MBA-I || 18.1 || data-sort-value="0.71" | 710 m || multiple || 2002–2021 || 04 Jan 2021 || 82 || align=left | Disc.: NEAT || 
|- id="2002 UD77" bgcolor=#fefefe
| 0 ||  || MBA-I || 18.13 || data-sort-value="0.70" | 700 m || multiple || 2002–2021 || 03 Dec 2021 || 130 || align=left | Disc.: NEAT || 
|- id="2002 UF77" bgcolor=#fefefe
| 0 ||  || MBA-I || 18.0 || data-sort-value="0.75" | 750 m || multiple || 2002–2021 || 05 Jan 2021 || 128 || align=left | Disc.: NEAT || 
|- id="2002 UM77" bgcolor=#fefefe
| 0 ||  || MBA-I || 18.58 || data-sort-value="0.57" | 570 m || multiple || 2002–2022 || 25 Jan 2022 || 49 || align=left | Disc.: NEAT || 
|- id="2002 US77" bgcolor=#d6d6d6
| 1 ||  || MBA-O || 16.7 || 2.5 km || multiple || 2002–2020 || 11 Dec 2020 || 35 || align=left | Disc.: NEATAlt.: 2008 UK70 || 
|- id="2002 UT77" bgcolor=#fefefe
| 1 ||  || MBA-I || 18.4 || data-sort-value="0.62" | 620 m || multiple || 2002–2020 || 05 Nov 2020 || 91 || align=left | Disc.: NEAT || 
|- id="2002 UU77" bgcolor=#E9E9E9
| 0 ||  || MBA-M || 17.0 || 1.2 km || multiple || 1996–2021 || 12 Jan 2021 || 147 || align=left | Disc.: NEATAlt.: 2005 JC173, 2014 OS384, 2017 FY59 || 
|- id="2002 UV77" bgcolor=#fefefe
| 0 ||  || HUN || 18.83 || data-sort-value="0.51" | 510 m || multiple || 2002–2021 || 05 Dec 2021 || 86 || align=left | Disc.: NEATAlt.: 2015 JT1 || 
|- id="2002 UB78" bgcolor=#d6d6d6
| 0 ||  || MBA-O || 17.25 || 2.0 km || multiple || 2002–2021 || 10 Apr 2021 || 85 || align=left | Disc.: NEATAlt.: 2015 FL58 || 
|- id="2002 UF78" bgcolor=#fefefe
| 1 ||  || MBA-I || 18.5 || data-sort-value="0.59" | 590 m || multiple || 2002–2019 || 29 Jul 2019 || 142 || align=left | Disc.: NEATAlt.: 2007 BU66 || 
|- id="2002 UH78" bgcolor=#E9E9E9
| 2 ||  || MBA-M || 18.1 || 1.0 km || multiple || 2002–2020 || 27 Jan 2020 || 45 || align=left | Disc.: NEAT || 
|- id="2002 UL78" bgcolor=#fefefe
| 0 ||  || MBA-I || 18.5 || data-sort-value="0.59" | 590 m || multiple || 2002–2020 || 05 Nov 2020 || 74 || align=left | Disc.: NEATAdded on 17 January 2021 || 
|- id="2002 UQ78" bgcolor=#fefefe
| 0 ||  || MBA-I || 18.66 || data-sort-value="0.55" | 550 m || multiple || 2002–2019 || 25 Oct 2019 || 67 || align=left | Disc.: NEATAlt.: 2009 VJ43 || 
|- id="2002 UY78" bgcolor=#E9E9E9
| 0 ||  || MBA-M || 17.5 || 1.3 km || multiple || 2002–2020 || 24 Jan 2020 || 69 || align=left | Disc.: NEATAlt.: 2019 UB31 || 
|- id="2002 UA79" bgcolor=#fefefe
| 0 ||  || MBA-I || 18.3 || data-sort-value="0.65" | 650 m || multiple || 2002–2020 || 16 Oct 2020 || 130 || align=left | Disc.: NEATAlt.: 2013 WX68 || 
|- id="2002 UD79" bgcolor=#fefefe
| 0 ||  || MBA-I || 17.54 || data-sort-value="0.92" | 920 m || multiple || 2002–2021 || 27 Nov 2021 || 186 || align=left | Disc.: NEAT || 
|- id="2002 UF79" bgcolor=#E9E9E9
| 0 ||  || MBA-M || 17.32 || 1.0 km || multiple || 2002–2021 || 03 May 2021 || 76 || align=left | Disc.: NEAT || 
|- id="2002 UG79" bgcolor=#E9E9E9
| 1 ||  || MBA-M || 16.8 || 1.3 km || multiple || 2002–2020 || 18 Apr 2020 || 102 || align=left | Disc.: NEAT || 
|- id="2002 UJ79" bgcolor=#E9E9E9
| 0 ||  || MBA-M || 17.7 || 1.6 km || multiple || 2002–2021 || 14 Nov 2021 || 56 || align=left | Disc.: SDSSAdded on 29 January 2022 || 
|- id="2002 UK79" bgcolor=#d6d6d6
| 0 ||  || MBA-O || 16.0 || 3.5 km || multiple || 2002–2020 || 12 Dec 2020 || 126 || align=left | Disc.: NEAT || 
|- id="2002 UO79" bgcolor=#d6d6d6
| 0 ||  || MBA-O || 16.6 || 2.7 km || multiple || 2002–2019 || 19 Dec 2019 || 79 || align=left | Disc.: NEAT || 
|- id="2002 UP79" bgcolor=#d6d6d6
| 0 ||  || MBA-O || 16.34 || 3.0 km || multiple || 1996–2021 || 14 Apr 2021 || 161 || align=left | Disc.: NEATAlt.: 2015 BJ158 || 
|- id="2002 UQ79" bgcolor=#E9E9E9
| 0 ||  || MBA-M || 17.2 || 1.5 km || multiple || 2002–2021 || 18 Jan 2021 || 235 || align=left | Disc.: NEATAlt.: 2013 HP93 || 
|- id="2002 UR79" bgcolor=#fefefe
| 0 ||  || MBA-I || 17.6 || data-sort-value="0.90" | 900 m || multiple || 2002–2020 || 15 Oct 2020 || 215 || align=left | Disc.: NEATAlt.: 2011 DE52 || 
|- id="2002 UV79" bgcolor=#d6d6d6
| 1 ||  || MBA-O || 15.9 || 3.7 km || multiple || 2002–2020 || 20 Nov 2020 || 116 || align=left | Disc.: NEATAlt.: 2010 JH42 || 
|- id="2002 UX79" bgcolor=#fefefe
| 0 ||  || MBA-I || 17.61 || data-sort-value="0.89" | 890 m || multiple || 2001–2021 || 14 Apr 2021 || 151 || align=left | Disc.: AMOSAlt.: 2008 JU18, 2012 PR37 || 
|- id="2002 UY79" bgcolor=#d6d6d6
| 0 ||  || MBA-O || 15.9 || 3.7 km || multiple || 2002–2021 || 17 Jan 2021 || 116 || align=left | Disc.: NEATAlt.: 2014 YR30 || 
|- id="2002 UZ79" bgcolor=#E9E9E9
| 0 ||  || MBA-M || 16.3 || 2.2 km || multiple || 2002–2021 || 17 Jan 2021 || 163 || align=left | Disc.: NEATAlt.: 2010 KV17, 2015 XW366 || 
|- id="2002 UA80" bgcolor=#FA8072
| 0 ||  || MCA || 17.9 || data-sort-value="0.78" | 780 m || multiple || 2002–2021 || 12 Jun 2021 || 199 || align=left | Disc.: AMOSAlt.: 2015 TY202 || 
|- id="2002 UB80" bgcolor=#d6d6d6
| 0 ||  || MBA-O || 16.26 || 3.1 km || multiple || 2002–2021 || 12 May 2021 || 198 || align=left | Disc.: NEATAlt.: 2005 GY91, 2015 FY80 || 
|- id="2002 UC80" bgcolor=#fefefe
| 1 ||  || MBA-I || 18.6 || data-sort-value="0.57" | 570 m || multiple || 2002–2021 || 16 Jan 2021 || 116 || align=left | Disc.: NEAT || 
|- id="2002 UD80" bgcolor=#E9E9E9
| 0 ||  || MBA-M || 17.17 || 1.1 km || multiple || 2002–2021 || 11 May 2021 || 128 || align=left | Disc.: NEAT || 
|- id="2002 UF80" bgcolor=#E9E9E9
| 1 ||  || MBA-M || 17.8 || data-sort-value="0.82" | 820 m || multiple || 2002–2016 || 05 Feb 2016 || 59 || align=left | Disc.: NEATAlt.: 2006 SE169 || 
|- id="2002 UG80" bgcolor=#fefefe
| 0 ||  || MBA-I || 18.1 || data-sort-value="0.71" | 710 m || multiple || 2002–2021 || 11 Jan 2021 || 129 || align=left | Disc.: NEATAlt.: 2007 BA53 || 
|- id="2002 UH80" bgcolor=#fefefe
| 0 ||  || MBA-I || 18.90 || data-sort-value="0.49" | 490 m || multiple || 2002–2021 || 27 Oct 2021 || 147 || align=left | Disc.: NEAT || 
|- id="2002 UK80" bgcolor=#E9E9E9
| – ||  || MBA-M || 18.5 || 1.2 km || single || 41 days || 11 Dec 2002 || 16 || align=left | Disc.: NEAT || 
|- id="2002 UL80" bgcolor=#E9E9E9
| 0 ||  || MBA-M || 16.68 || 2.6 km || multiple || 2002–2021 || 30 Dec 2021 || 125 || align=left | Disc.: NEAT || 
|- id="2002 UQ80" bgcolor=#E9E9E9
| 0 ||  || MBA-M || 17.29 || 1.0 km || multiple || 2002–2021 || 19 May 2021 || 141 || align=left | Disc.: LPL/Spacewatch II || 
|- id="2002 UR80" bgcolor=#fefefe
| 0 ||  || MBA-I || 17.82 || data-sort-value="0.81" | 810 m || multiple || 2002–2022 || 07 Jan 2022 || 107 || align=left | Disc.: LPL/Spacewatch II || 
|- id="2002 US80" bgcolor=#fefefe
| 0 ||  || MBA-I || 18.1 || data-sort-value="0.71" | 710 m || multiple || 2002–2020 || 07 Dec 2020 || 120 || align=left | Disc.: LPL/Spacewatch II || 
|- id="2002 UU80" bgcolor=#E9E9E9
| 0 ||  || MBA-M || 17.3 || 1.5 km || multiple || 2002–2019 || 31 Oct 2019 || 81 || align=left | Disc.: NEAT || 
|- id="2002 UV80" bgcolor=#fefefe
| 0 ||  || MBA-I || 18.6 || data-sort-value="0.57" | 570 m || multiple || 2002–2017 || 09 Dec 2017 || 58 || align=left | Disc.: LPL/Spacewatch II || 
|- id="2002 UW80" bgcolor=#fefefe
| 0 ||  || MBA-I || 17.7 || data-sort-value="0.86" | 860 m || multiple || 2002–2021 || 10 Jan 2021 || 123 || align=left | Disc.: LPL/Spacewatch II || 
|- id="2002 UY80" bgcolor=#fefefe
| 0 ||  || MBA-I || 17.8 || data-sort-value="0.82" | 820 m || multiple || 2002–2020 || 07 Dec 2020 || 84 || align=left | Disc.: LPL/Spacewatch II || 
|- id="2002 UZ80" bgcolor=#fefefe
| 0 ||  || MBA-I || 17.9 || data-sort-value="0.78" | 780 m || multiple || 2002–2021 || 18 Jan 2021 || 78 || align=left | Disc.: NEAT || 
|- id="2002 UA81" bgcolor=#E9E9E9
| 0 ||  || MBA-M || 17.3 || 1.0 km || multiple || 2002–2021 || 12 Jun 2021 || 70 || align=left | Disc.: LPL/Spacewatch II || 
|- id="2002 UB81" bgcolor=#d6d6d6
| 0 ||  || MBA-O || 16.1 || 3.4 km || multiple || 2000–2021 || 04 Jan 2021 || 84 || align=left | Disc.: LPL/Spacewatch II || 
|- id="2002 UC81" bgcolor=#fefefe
| 0 ||  || MBA-I || 18.15 || data-sort-value="0.70" | 700 m || multiple || 2002–2022 || 27 Jan 2022 || 94 || align=left | Disc.: NEAT || 
|- id="2002 UD81" bgcolor=#fefefe
| 0 ||  || MBA-I || 18.82 || data-sort-value="0.51" | 510 m || multiple || 2002–2021 || 08 Dec 2021 || 54 || align=left | Disc.: NEAT || 
|- id="2002 UE81" bgcolor=#d6d6d6
| 0 ||  || MBA-O || 16.0 || 3.5 km || multiple || 2002–2019 || 27 Nov 2019 || 68 || align=left | Disc.: LPL/Spacewatch II || 
|- id="2002 UF81" bgcolor=#E9E9E9
| 0 ||  || MBA-M || 17.9 || 1.5 km || multiple || 2002–2021 || 06 Jan 2021 || 51 || align=left | Disc.: La Palma Obs. || 
|- id="2002 UG81" bgcolor=#d6d6d6
| 0 ||  || MBA-O || 16.6 || 2.7 km || multiple || 2002–2021 || 18 Jan 2021 || 73 || align=left | Disc.: LPL/Spacewatch II || 
|- id="2002 UH81" bgcolor=#fefefe
| 0 ||  || MBA-I || 18.75 || data-sort-value="0.53" | 530 m || multiple || 2002–2021 || 09 Nov 2021 || 105 || align=left | Disc.: NEAT || 
|- id="2002 UJ81" bgcolor=#d6d6d6
| 0 ||  || MBA-O || 16.42 || 2.9 km || multiple || 2002–2021 || 10 Apr 2021 || 91 || align=left | Disc.: LPL/Spacewatch II || 
|- id="2002 UK81" bgcolor=#E9E9E9
| 0 ||  || MBA-M || 17.4 || 1.4 km || multiple || 2002–2020 || 17 Dec 2020 || 48 || align=left | Disc.: LPL/Spacewatch II || 
|- id="2002 UL81" bgcolor=#fefefe
| 1 ||  || HUN || 18.6 || data-sort-value="0.57" | 570 m || multiple || 2002–2020 || 16 Oct 2020 || 48 || align=left | Disc.: NEAT || 
|- id="2002 UM81" bgcolor=#E9E9E9
| 0 ||  || MBA-M || 17.8 || 1.2 km || multiple || 2002–2020 || 22 Jan 2020 || 46 || align=left | Disc.: LPL/Spacewatch II || 
|- id="2002 UO81" bgcolor=#fefefe
| 0 ||  || MBA-I || 18.32 || data-sort-value="0.64" | 640 m || multiple || 2002–2021 || 08 May 2021 || 128 || align=left | Disc.: LONEOS || 
|- id="2002 UP81" bgcolor=#d6d6d6
| 0 ||  || MBA-O || 16.6 || 2.7 km || multiple || 2002–2018 || 30 Sep 2018 || 76 || align=left | Disc.: NEAT || 
|- id="2002 UQ81" bgcolor=#fefefe
| 0 ||  || MBA-I || 18.0 || data-sort-value="0.75" | 750 m || multiple || 1995–2019 || 29 Sep 2019 || 76 || align=left | Disc.: NEAT || 
|- id="2002 UR81" bgcolor=#E9E9E9
| 0 ||  || MBA-M || 17.40 || 1.4 km || multiple || 2002–2021 || 15 Apr 2021 || 124 || align=left | Disc.: NEAT || 
|- id="2002 US81" bgcolor=#E9E9E9
| 0 ||  || MBA-M || 16.95 || 1.7 km || multiple || 2002–2021 || 12 May 2021 || 102 || align=left | Disc.: LPL/Spacewatch II || 
|- id="2002 UT81" bgcolor=#d6d6d6
| 0 ||  || MBA-O || 16.0 || 3.5 km || multiple || 2002–2021 || 15 Jan 2021 || 119 || align=left | Disc.: AMOS || 
|- id="2002 UU81" bgcolor=#d6d6d6
| 0 ||  || MBA-O || 16.6 || 2.7 km || multiple || 2002–2021 || 07 Jan 2021 || 68 || align=left | Disc.: LPL/Spacewatch II || 
|- id="2002 UV81" bgcolor=#E9E9E9
| 0 ||  || MBA-M || 17.5 || 1.3 km || multiple || 2002–2020 || 27 Jan 2020 || 71 || align=left | Disc.: NEAT || 
|- id="2002 UZ81" bgcolor=#d6d6d6
| 1 ||  || MBA-O || 17.0 || 2.2 km || multiple || 2002–2021 || 12 Jan 2021 || 37 || align=left | Disc.: LPL/Spacewatch II || 
|- id="2002 UA82" bgcolor=#fefefe
| 0 ||  || MBA-I || 18.4 || data-sort-value="0.62" | 620 m || multiple || 2002–2019 || 23 Sep 2019 || 34 || align=left | Disc.: NEAT || 
|- id="2002 UB82" bgcolor=#C2FFFF
| 0 ||  || JT || 14.0 || 8.8 km || multiple || 2002–2020 || 22 Jun 2020 || 81 || align=left | Disc.: LPL/Spacewatch IITrojan camp (L5) || 
|- id="2002 UC82" bgcolor=#fefefe
| 0 ||  || MBA-I || 18.2 || data-sort-value="0.68" | 680 m || multiple || 2002–2021 || 17 Jan 2021 || 51 || align=left | Disc.: NEAT || 
|- id="2002 UD82" bgcolor=#fefefe
| 0 ||  || MBA-I || 18.40 || data-sort-value="0.62" | 620 m || multiple || 2002–2021 || 06 Jan 2021 || 56 || align=left | Disc.: LPL/Spacewatch II || 
|- id="2002 UE82" bgcolor=#E9E9E9
| 1 ||  || MBA-M || 18.2 || data-sort-value="0.96" | 960 m || multiple || 2002–2019 || 20 Dec 2019 || 42 || align=left | Disc.: NEAT || 
|- id="2002 UF82" bgcolor=#E9E9E9
| 0 ||  || MBA-M || 17.6 || 1.3 km || multiple || 2002–2021 || 14 Jan 2021 || 43 || align=left | Disc.: La Palma Obs. || 
|- id="2002 UJ82" bgcolor=#d6d6d6
| 0 ||  || MBA-O || 16.7 || 2.5 km || multiple || 2002–2021 || 15 Jun 2021 || 50 || align=left | Disc.: LPL/Spacewatch IIAdded on 19 October 2020 || 
|- id="2002 UK82" bgcolor=#fefefe
| 2 ||  || MBA-I || 18.5 || data-sort-value="0.59" | 590 m || multiple || 2002–2020 || 12 Dec 2020 || 45 || align=left | Disc.: NEAT Added on 9 March 2021 || 
|}
back to top

V 

|- id="2002 VS" bgcolor=#fefefe
| – || 2002 VS || MBA-I || 18.3 || data-sort-value="0.65" | 650 m || single || 13 days || 12 Nov 2002 || 13 || align=left | Disc.: Table Mountain Obs. || 
|- id="2002 VX" bgcolor=#fefefe
| 1 || 2002 VX || MBA-I || 18.1 || data-sort-value="0.71" | 710 m || multiple || 1995–2021 || 06 Jan 2021 || 40 || align=left | Disc.: La Palma Obs. || 
|- id="2002 VZ" bgcolor=#fefefe
| 0 || 2002 VZ || MBA-I || 18.8 || data-sort-value="0.52" | 520 m || multiple || 2002–2021 || 14 May 2021 || 152 || align=left | Disc.: Table Mountain Obs.Alt.: 2012 TQ74 || 
|- id="2002 VD1" bgcolor=#d6d6d6
| 0 ||  || MBA-O || 16.7 || 2.5 km || multiple || 2002–2021 || 08 Jun 2021 || 67 || align=left | Disc.: La Palma Obs. || 
|- id="2002 VE1" bgcolor=#E9E9E9
| 0 ||  || MBA-M || 17.67 || 1.6 km || multiple || 2002–2021 || 28 Nov 2021 || 93 || align=left | Disc.: La Palma Obs. || 
|- id="2002 VL1" bgcolor=#fefefe
| 0 ||  || MBA-I || 18.0 || data-sort-value="0.75" | 750 m || multiple || 2001–2020 || 10 Dec 2020 || 100 || align=left | Disc.: La Palma Obs.Alt.: 2009 SQ204 || 
|- id="2002 VM1" bgcolor=#d6d6d6
| 3 ||  || MBA-O || 18.6 || 1.1 km || multiple || 2002–2018 || 29 Nov 2018 || 40 || align=left | Disc.: La Palma Obs.Alt.: 2007 RF71 || 
|- id="2002 VO1" bgcolor=#d6d6d6
| E ||  || MBA-O || 19.0 || data-sort-value="0.88" | 880 m || single || 3 days || 04 Nov 2002 || 12 || align=left | Disc.: La Palma Obs. || 
|- id="2002 VS1" bgcolor=#fefefe
| 0 ||  || MBA-I || 18.19 || data-sort-value="0.68" | 680 m || multiple || 1998–2021 || 03 Dec 2021 || 143 || align=left | Disc.: La Palma Obs.Alt.: 2015 BQ73 || 
|- id="2002 VU1" bgcolor=#fefefe
| 1 ||  || MBA-I || 18.63 || data-sort-value="0.49" | 580 m || multiple || 2002-2021 || 26 Oct 2021 || 88 || align=left | Disc.: La Palma Obs.Alt.: 2006 WU25 || 
|- id="2002 VV1" bgcolor=#fefefe
| E ||  || MBA-I || 20.4 || data-sort-value="0.25" | 250 m || single || 4 days || 06 Nov 2002 || 12 || align=left | Disc.: La Palma Obs. || 
|- id="2002 VF2" bgcolor=#d6d6d6
| 2 ||  || MBA-O || 17.8 || 1.5 km || multiple || 2002–2017 || 21 Sep 2017 || 41 || align=left | Disc.: AMOS || 
|- id="2002 VH2" bgcolor=#E9E9E9
| 1 ||  || MBA-M || 17.9 || 1.5 km || multiple || 2002–2020 || 14 Dec 2020 || 60 || align=left | Disc.: Table Mountain Obs. || 
|- id="2002 VM2" bgcolor=#d6d6d6
| 0 ||  || MBA-O || 17.20 || 2.0 km || multiple || 2002–2021 || 18 May 2021 || 41 || align=left | Disc.: La PalmaAdded on 21 August 2021Alt.: 2017 RJ131 || 
|- id="2002 VX2" bgcolor=#d6d6d6
| 0 ||  || MBA-O || 16.4 || 2.9 km || multiple || 2002–2021 || 17 Jan 2021 || 122 || align=left | Disc.: Table Mountain Obs.Alt.: 2016 EO30 || 
|- id="2002 VY2" bgcolor=#E9E9E9
| 3 ||  || MBA-M || 18.2 || data-sort-value="0.96" | 960 m || multiple || 2002–2019 || 26 Nov 2019 || 40 || align=left | Disc.: Table Mountain Obs. || 
|- id="2002 VG3" bgcolor=#fefefe
| 0 ||  || MBA-I || 18.1 || data-sort-value="0.71" | 710 m || multiple || 2002–2020 || 23 Mar 2020 || 122 || align=left | Disc.: NEAT || 
|- id="2002 VP4" bgcolor=#d6d6d6
| 0 ||  || MBA-O || 16.3 || 3.1 km || multiple || 2002–2021 || 12 Jan 2021 || 109 || align=left | Disc.: NEATAlt.: 2008 YP68 || 
|- id="2002 VW4" bgcolor=#E9E9E9
| 0 ||  || MBA-M || 16.99 || 1.7 km || multiple || 1999–2021 || 09 Apr 2021 || 118 || align=left | Disc.: LPL/Spacewatch IIAlt.: 2006 UU223 || 
|- id="2002 VX5" bgcolor=#E9E9E9
| 0 ||  || MBA-M || 17.1 || 2.1 km || multiple || 2002–2020 || 14 Oct 2020 || 49 || align=left | Disc.: La Palma Obs.Alt.: 2014 HN144 || 
|- id="2002 VL6" bgcolor=#d6d6d6
| 0 ||  || MBA-O || 17.3 || 1.9 km || multiple || 2002–2020 || 21 Feb 2020 || 43 || align=left | Disc.: La Palma Obs. || 
|- id="2002 VP7" bgcolor=#E9E9E9
| 0 ||  || MBA-M || 17.1 || 1.6 km || multiple || 2002–2021 || 09 Jan 2021 || 151 || align=left | Disc.: NEATAlt.: 2011 XF3 || 
|- id="2002 VJ9" bgcolor=#fefefe
| 0 ||  || MBA-I || 18.41 || data-sort-value="0.62" | 620 m || multiple || 2002–2021 || 09 Apr 2021 || 101 || align=left | Disc.: NEAT || 
|- id="2002 VG10" bgcolor=#E9E9E9
| 0 ||  || MBA-M || 16.8 || 2.4 km || multiple || 2002–2021 || 15 Jan 2021 || 235 || align=left | Disc.: NEATAlt.: 2011 US191 || 
|- id="2002 VF11" bgcolor=#E9E9E9
| 1 ||  || MBA-M || 17.2 || 1.8 km || multiple || 2002–2019 || 25 Nov 2019 || 81 || align=left | Disc.: NEATAlt.: 2006 SU111 || 
|- id="2002 VN11" bgcolor=#d6d6d6
| 2 ||  || MBA-O || 16.8 || 2.4 km || multiple || 2002–2018 || 13 Jan 2018 || 129 || align=left | Disc.: NEATAlt.: 2007 VN163, 2014 EN70 || 
|- id="2002 VB13" bgcolor=#fefefe
| 0 ||  || MBA-I || 17.99 || data-sort-value="0.75" | 750 m || multiple || 2001–2022 || 25 Jan 2022 || 94 || align=left | Disc.: NEAT || 
|- id="2002 VQ14" bgcolor=#FFC2E0
| 5 ||  || AMO || 21.1 || data-sort-value="0.21" | 210 m || single || 38 days || 13 Dec 2002 || 69 || align=left | Disc.: LINEAR || 
|- id="2002 VR14" bgcolor=#FFC2E0
| 6 ||  || APO || 22.4 || data-sort-value="0.12" | 120 m || single || 39 days || 12 Nov 2002 || 34 || align=left | Disc.: NEAT || 
|- id="2002 VS14" bgcolor=#FFC2E0
| 4 ||  || APO || 21.8 || data-sort-value="0.16" | 160 m || multiple || 2002–2006 || 24 Nov 2006 || 72 || align=left | Disc.: LONEOS || 
|- id="2002 VJ15" bgcolor=#fefefe
| 0 ||  || HUN || 18.09 || data-sort-value="0.72" | 720 m || multiple || 2002–2022 || 19 Jan 2022 || 158 || align=left | Disc.: LINEARAlt.: 2010 UT69 || 
|- id="2002 VC16" bgcolor=#fefefe
| 0 ||  || MBA-I || 17.8 || data-sort-value="0.82" | 820 m || multiple || 1993–2021 || 16 Jan 2021 || 159 || align=left | Disc.: LONEOS || 
|- id="2002 VU17" bgcolor=#FFC2E0
| 7 ||  || APO || 24.9 || data-sort-value="0.037" | 37 m || single || 29 days || 05 Dec 2002 || 51 || align=left | Disc.: LINEAR || 
|- id="2002 VW17" bgcolor=#FA8072
| – ||  || MCA || 20.1 || data-sort-value="0.28" | 280 m || single || 2 days || 09 Nov 2002 || 13 || align=left | Disc.: LPL/Spacewatch II || 
|- id="2002 VX17" bgcolor=#FFC2E0
| 5 ||  || AMO || 22.1 || data-sort-value="0.14" | 140 m || single || 84 days || 27 Dec 2002 || 82 || align=left | Disc.: LINEAR || 
|- id="2002 VO18" bgcolor=#d6d6d6
| 0 ||  || MBA-O || 16.61 || 2.7 km || multiple || 2002–2021 || 30 Jun 2021 || 143 || align=left | Disc.: Kvistaberg Obs.Alt.: 2014 AD40 || 
|- id="2002 VP18" bgcolor=#E9E9E9
| 0 ||  || MBA-M || 16.64 || 2.0 km || multiple || 2002–2021 || 01 Apr 2021 || 276 || align=left | Disc.: Kvistaberg Obs.Alt.: 2015 TU183 || 
|- id="2002 VR18" bgcolor=#E9E9E9
| 0 ||  || MBA-M || 16.52 || 2.8 km || multiple || 2002–2021 || 06 Dec 2021 || 215 || align=left | Disc.: LPL/Spacewatch IIAlt.: 2014 JJ61 || 
|- id="2002 VU21" bgcolor=#fefefe
| 0 ||  || MBA-I || 17.6 || 2.5 km || multiple || 2002–2021 || 05 Jan 2021 || 245 || align=left | Disc.: LINEAR || 
|- id="2002 VV24" bgcolor=#E9E9E9
| 0 ||  || MBA-M || 17.70 || 1.2 km || multiple || 2002–2021 || 07 Apr 2021 || 161 || align=left | Disc.: LPL/Spacewatch IIAlt.: 2012 AD9 || 
|- id="2002 VD25" bgcolor=#fefefe
| 1 ||  || MBA-I || 18.1 || data-sort-value="0.71" | 710 m || multiple || 2002–2020 || 11 Oct 2020 || 133 || align=left | Disc.: LINEAR || 
|- id="2002 VJ25" bgcolor=#E9E9E9
| 0 ||  || MBA-M || 16.9 || 1.8 km || multiple || 2002–2020 || 12 Dec 2020 || 322 || align=left | Disc.: LINEARAlt.: 2010 LJ106 || 
|- id="2002 VK25" bgcolor=#FA8072
| 0 ||  || MCA || 16.6 || 2.0 km || multiple || 2002–2020 || 31 May 2020 || 390 || align=left | Disc.: LPL/Spacewatch IIAlt.: 2011 YP62 || 
|- id="2002 VL25" bgcolor=#fefefe
| 0 ||  || MBA-I || 17.0 || 1.2 km || multiple || 2002–2021 || 14 Jan 2021 || 227 || align=left | Disc.: LINEARAlt.: 2011 FB104 || 
|- id="2002 VF37" bgcolor=#d6d6d6
| 0 ||  || MBA-O || 16.35 || 3.0 km || multiple || 2002–2021 || 03 Apr 2021 || 145 || align=left | Disc.: NEATAlt.: 2013 TA9 || 
|- id="2002 VG37" bgcolor=#E9E9E9
| 0 ||  || MBA-M || 17.5 || 1.8 km || multiple || 2002–2021 || 17 Jan 2021 || 149 || align=left | Disc.: NEAT || 
|- id="2002 VN37" bgcolor=#fefefe
| 1 ||  || MBA-I || 17.8 || data-sort-value="0.82" | 820 m || multiple || 2002–2017 || 14 Dec 2017 || 90 || align=left | Disc.: LPL/Spacewatch II || 
|- id="2002 VW39" bgcolor=#E9E9E9
| 1 ||  || MBA-M || 17.0 || 2.2 km || multiple || 2002–2021 || 05 Jan 2021 || 134 || align=left | Disc.: LINEAR || 
|- id="2002 VV40" bgcolor=#E9E9E9
| 0 ||  || MBA-M || 17.3 || 1.9 km || multiple || 2002–2020 || 22 Oct 2020 || 44 || align=left | Disc.: NEAT || 
|- id="2002 VU42" bgcolor=#d6d6d6
| 3 ||  || MBA-O || 16.9 || 2.3 km || multiple || 2002–2019 || 02 Jan 2019 || 69 || align=left | Disc.: AMOS || 
|- id="2002 VZ42" bgcolor=#fefefe
| 0 ||  || MBA-I || 17.9 || 1.4 km || multiple || 2001–2021 || 08 Jan 2021 || 132 || align=left | Disc.: NEATAlt.: 2010 BE43 || 
|- id="2002 VW44" bgcolor=#E9E9E9
| 0 ||  || MBA-M || 17.30 || 1.5 km || multiple || 2002–2021 || 15 Apr 2021 || 204 || align=left | Disc.: LONEOS || 
|- id="2002 VL45" bgcolor=#E9E9E9
| 0 ||  || MBA-M || 17.2 || 1.5 km || multiple || 2002–2021 || 17 Jan 2021 || 202 || align=left | Disc.: LINEAR || 
|- id="2002 VP45" bgcolor=#E9E9E9
| 0 ||  || MBA-M || 16.5 || 2.8 km || multiple || 2002–2020 || 15 Oct 2020 || 181 || align=left | Disc.: LINEARAlt.: 2011 VP23 || 
|- id="2002 VO46" bgcolor=#fefefe
| 0 ||  || MBA-I || 17.7 || data-sort-value="0.86" | 860 m || multiple || 2002–2021 || 10 Jan 2021 || 178 || align=left | Disc.: NEAT || 
|- id="2002 VT46" bgcolor=#d6d6d6
| 0 ||  || MBA-O || 16.00 || 3.5 km || multiple || 2002–2021 || 29 Apr 2021 || 249 || align=left | Disc.: NEATAlt.: 2013 RO97 || 
|- id="2002 VT51" bgcolor=#fefefe
| 0 ||  || MBA-I || 17.9 || data-sort-value="0.78" | 780 m || multiple || 2002–2019 || 26 Nov 2019 || 119 || align=left | Disc.: LONEOSAlt.: 2009 WG255, 2009 XT24 || 
|- id="2002 VY51" bgcolor=#fefefe
| 0 ||  || MBA-I || 17.3 || 1.0 km || multiple || 2002–2021 || 12 Jan 2021 || 325 || align=left | Disc.: LONEOSAlt.: 2012 HO74 || 
|- id="2002 VW53" bgcolor=#d6d6d6
| 0 ||  || MBA-O || 16.86 || 2.4 km || multiple || 2002–2021 || 09 May 2021 || 81 || align=left | Disc.: LINEAR || 
|- id="2002 VX56" bgcolor=#d6d6d6
| 0 ||  || MBA-O || 16.17 || 3.2 km || multiple || 2002–2021 || 02 Apr 2021 || 167 || align=left | Disc.: Farpoint Obs.Alt.: 2014 YM31 || 
|- id="2002 VK57" bgcolor=#d6d6d6
| 0 ||  || MBA-O || 15.4 || 4.6 km || multiple || 2002–2018 || 14 Dec 2018 || 72 || align=left | Disc.: AMOS || 
|- id="2002 VB58" bgcolor=#fefefe
| 1 ||  || MBA-I || 18.2 || data-sort-value="0.68" | 680 m || multiple || 2002–2019 || 23 Oct 2019 || 67 || align=left | Disc.: AMOSAlt.: 2009 WV246 || 
|- id="2002 VD58" bgcolor=#d6d6d6
| 0 ||  || MBA-O || 16.38 || 2.9 km || multiple || 2002–2021 || 03 Apr 2021 || 156 || align=left | Disc.: AMOSAlt.: 2013 WC31 || 
|- id="2002 VG65" bgcolor=#fefefe
| 1 ||  || MBA-I || 18.4 || data-sort-value="0.62" | 620 m || multiple || 2002–2020 || 04 Jan 2020 || 78 || align=left | Disc.: LINEAR || 
|- id="2002 VQ65" bgcolor=#fefefe
| 1 ||  || MBA-I || 17.5 || data-sort-value="0.94" | 940 m || multiple || 2002–2021 || 10 Jan 2021 || 216 || align=left | Disc.: LINEAR || 
|- id="2002 VQ66" bgcolor=#fefefe
| 0 ||  || MBA-I || 17.6 || data-sort-value="0.90" | 900 m || multiple || 2002–2020 || 22 Mar 2020 || 231 || align=left | Disc.: LINEAR || 
|- id="2002 VO69" bgcolor=#FFC2E0
| 7 ||  || APO || 22.9 || data-sort-value="0.093" | 93 m || single || 9 days || 14 Nov 2002 || 29 || align=left | Disc.: LINEAR || 
|- id="2002 VP69" bgcolor=#FFC2E0
| 0 ||  || APO || 17.9 || data-sort-value="0.93" | 930 m || multiple || 2002–2020 || 18 May 2020 || 285 || align=left | Disc.: LINEARPotentially hazardous objectNEO larger than 1 kilometer || 
|- id="2002 VQ69" bgcolor=#FA8072
| – ||  || MCA || 19.3 || data-sort-value="0.58" | 580 m || single || 33 days || 14 Dec 2002 || 49 || align=left | Disc.: LONEOS || 
|- id="2002 VS70" bgcolor=#E9E9E9
| 0 ||  || MBA-M || 17.28 || 1.5 km || multiple || 2000–2021 || 11 May 2021 || 194 || align=left | Disc.: LINEARAlt.: 2008 CY183, 2012 BN130 || 
|- id="2002 VG71" bgcolor=#fefefe
| 0 ||  || MBA-I || 17.8 || data-sort-value="0.82" | 820 m || multiple || 2002–2019 || 03 Apr 2019 || 100 || align=left | Disc.: LINEARAlt.: 2013 RM37 || 
|- id="2002 VV72" bgcolor=#d6d6d6
| 0 ||  || MBA-O || 16.5 || 2.8 km || multiple || 2002–2020 || 02 Feb 2020 || 148 || align=left | Disc.: LINEAR || 
|- id="2002 VZ72" bgcolor=#fefefe
| 0 ||  || MBA-I || 16.81 || 1.3 km || multiple || 2002–2022 || 14 Jan 2022 || 135 || align=left | Disc.: LINEAR || 
|- id="2002 VL74" bgcolor=#d6d6d6
| 0 ||  || MBA-O || 15.8 || 3.9 km || multiple || 2002–2020 || 28 Jan 2020 || 232 || align=left | Disc.: LINEARAlt.: 2013 PO65 || 
|- id="2002 VT75" bgcolor=#E9E9E9
| 1 ||  || MBA-M || 17.5 || 1.3 km || multiple || 2002–2017 || 31 Jan 2017 || 75 || align=left | Disc.: LINEARAlt.: 2015 TE189 || 
|- id="2002 VO85" bgcolor=#FFC2E0
| 2 ||  || AMO || 21.6 || data-sort-value="0.17" | 170 m || multiple || 2002–2020 || 13 Jun 2020 || 59 || align=left | Disc.: LINEAR || 
|- id="2002 VP85" bgcolor=#FFC2E0
| 2 ||  || AMO || 20.0 || data-sort-value="0.36" | 360 m || multiple || 2002–2020 || 10 Dec 2020 || 69 || align=left | Disc.: LONEOS || 
|- id="2002 VR85" bgcolor=#FFC2E0
| 1 ||  || APO || 20.3 || data-sort-value="0.31" | 310 m || multiple || 2002–2020 || 26 Jun 2020 || 256 || align=left | Disc.: LINEARPotentially hazardous object || 
|- id="2002 VS85" bgcolor=#FFC2E0
| 8 ||  || APO || 24.1 || data-sort-value="0.054" | 54 m || single || 3 days || 15 Nov 2002 || 34 || align=left | Disc.: LINEAR || 
|- id="2002 VU90" bgcolor=#d6d6d6
| 1 ||  || MBA-O || 17.2 || 2.0 km || multiple || 2002–2020 || 22 Apr 2020 || 59 || align=left | Disc.: LPL/Spacewatch IIAlt.: 2007 VS25 || 
|- id="2002 VX90" bgcolor=#fefefe
| 1 ||  || MBA-I || 18.3 || data-sort-value="0.65" | 650 m || multiple || 2002–2020 || 21 Aug 2020 || 35 || align=left | Disc.: LPL/Spacewatch IIAlt.: 2013 WO47 || 
|- id="2002 VV91" bgcolor=#E9E9E9
| 0 ||  || MBA-M || 18.04 || data-sort-value="0.73" | 730 m || multiple || 2002–2021 || 10 Apr 2021 || 53 || align=left | Disc.: LINEAR || 
|- id="2002 VX91" bgcolor=#FFC2E0
| 3 ||  || ATE || 24.3 || data-sort-value="0.049" | 49 m || multiple || 2002–2008 || 28 Feb 2008 || 43 || align=left | Disc.: LINEAR || 
|- id="2002 VY91" bgcolor=#FFC2E0
| 6 ||  || APO || 26.3 || data-sort-value="0.020" | 20 m || single || 22 days || 04 Dec 2002 || 20 || align=left | Disc.: LINEAR || 
|- id="2002 VZ91" bgcolor=#FFC2E0
| 7 ||  || APO || 26.1 || data-sort-value="0.021" | 21 m || single || 16 days || 28 Nov 2002 || 26 || align=left | Disc.: LINEAR || 
|- id="2002 VE92" bgcolor=#d6d6d6
| 0 ||  || MBA-O || 16.82 || 2.4 km || multiple || 2002–2021 || 05 Jul 2021 || 84 || align=left | Disc.: Mount Nyukasa Stn.Alt.: 2002 VE132 || 
|- id="2002 VC93" bgcolor=#fefefe
| 0 ||  || MBA-I || 17.1 || 2.1 km || multiple || 2002–2021 || 04 Jan 2021 || 199 || align=left | Disc.: LINEARAlt.: 2002 XH115, 2009 TV48, 2009 UD67, 2009 WX174 || 
|- id="2002 VR94" bgcolor=#FFC2E0
| 0 ||  || AMO || 19.1 || data-sort-value="0.54" | 540 m || multiple || 2002–2014 || 23 Jan 2014 || 142 || align=left | Disc.: LINEAR || 
|- id="2002 VT94" bgcolor=#FFC2E0
| 4 ||  || AMO || 19.7 || data-sort-value="0.41" | 410 m || single || 78 days || 30 Jan 2003 || 55 || align=left | Disc.: LINEAR || 
|- id="2002 VZ94" bgcolor=#C2E0FF
| E ||  || TNO || 7.0 || 137 km || single || 18 days || 29 Nov 2002 || 9 || align=left | Disc.: Kitt Peak Obs.LoUTNOs, cubewano? || 
|- id="2002 VA95" bgcolor=#C2E0FF
| E ||  || TNO || 8.3 || 75 km || single || 1 day || 13 Nov 2002 || 5 || align=left | Disc.: Kitt Peak Obs.LoUTNOs, cubewano? || 
|- id="2002 VB95" bgcolor=#C2E0FF
| E ||  || TNO || 8.9 || 78 km || single || 18 days || 30 Nov 2002 || 12 || align=left | Disc.: Kitt Peak Obs.LoUTNOs, plutino? || 
|- id="2002 VC95" bgcolor=#C2E0FF
| E ||  || TNO || 8.0 || 86 km || single || 18 days || 30 Nov 2002 || 11 || align=left | Disc.: Kitt Peak Obs.LoUTNOs, cubewano? || 
|- id="2002 VD95" bgcolor=#C2E0FF
| E ||  || TNO || 8.6 || 79 km || single || 1 day || 13 Nov 2002 || 5 || align=left | Disc.: Kitt Peak Obs.LoUTNOs, other TNO || 
|- id="2002 VH95" bgcolor=#d6d6d6
| 0 ||  || MBA-O || 16.16 || 3.3 km || multiple || 2001–2021 || 15 May 2021 || 169 || align=left | Disc.: LINEARAlt.: 2010 MN66 || 
|- id="2002 VP95" bgcolor=#d6d6d6
| 0 ||  || MBA-O || 15.70 || 4.0 km || multiple || 2002–2021 || 10 Apr 2021 || 183 || align=left | Disc.: LINEARAlt.: 2013 SJ30 || 
|- id="2002 VH97" bgcolor=#fefefe
| 0 ||  || MBA-I || 17.95 || data-sort-value="0.76" | 760 m || multiple || 2002–2022 || 21 Jan 2022 || 156 || align=left | Disc.: LINEAR || 
|- id="2002 VC98" bgcolor=#E9E9E9
| 0 ||  || MBA-M || 17.1 || 2.1 km || multiple || 2002–2020 || 18 Dec 2020 || 128 || align=left | Disc.: LINEAR || 
|- id="2002 VG98" bgcolor=#fefefe
| 0 ||  || MBA-I || 19.79 || data-sort-value="0.33" | 330 m || multiple || 2002–2021 || 27 Nov 2021 || 80 || align=left | Disc.: LPL/Spacewatch IIAdded on 22 July 2020 || 
|- id="2002 VR98" bgcolor=#fefefe
| 1 ||  || MBA-I || 18.29 || data-sort-value="0.65" | 650 m || multiple || 2002–2021 || 10 Aug 2021 || 51 || align=left | Disc.: LPL/Spacewatch IIAlt.: 2002 UK43 || 
|- id="2002 VT98" bgcolor=#E9E9E9
| 0 ||  || MBA-M || 17.28 || 1.5 km || multiple || 2002–2021 || 19 Apr 2021 || 125 || align=left | Disc.: LPL/Spacewatch IIAlt.: 2015 WS8 || 
|- id="2002 VB99" bgcolor=#E9E9E9
| 0 ||  || MBA-M || 16.7 || 2.8 km || multiple || 2002–2020 || 26 Jan 2020 || 377 || align=left | Disc.: LINEAR || 
|- id="2002 VF99" bgcolor=#d6d6d6
| 0 ||  || MBA-O || 15.82 || 3.8 km || multiple || 2002–2021 || 08 Apr 2021 || 155 || align=left | Disc.: LPL/Spacewatch II || 
|- id="2002 VG99" bgcolor=#fefefe
| 0 ||  || MBA-I || 18.3 || data-sort-value="0.65" | 650 m || multiple || 2002–2020 || 16 Nov 2020 || 67 || align=left | Disc.: LPL/Spacewatch IIAdded on 17 January 2021Alt.: 2013 TT181 || 
|- id="2002 VC101" bgcolor=#E9E9E9
| 0 ||  || MBA-M || 17.2 || 2.0 km || multiple || 2002–2021 || 03 Jan 2021 || 93 || align=left | Disc.: LONEOSAlt.: 2015 PQ290 || 
|- id="2002 VY101" bgcolor=#d6d6d6
| 0 ||  || MBA-O || 16.41 || 2.9 km || multiple || 2002–2021 || 01 Jul 2021 || 186 || align=left | Disc.: LINEAR || 
|- id="2002 VT103" bgcolor=#E9E9E9
| 0 ||  || MBA-M || 17.24 || 1.1 km || multiple || 2002–2021 || 14 Apr 2021 || 88 || align=left | Disc.: LINEAR || 
|- id="2002 VV105" bgcolor=#E9E9E9
| 0 ||  || MBA-M || 16.7 || 1.9 km || multiple || 2002–2021 || 17 Jan 2021 || 205 || align=left | Disc.: LINEAR || 
|- id="2002 VX105" bgcolor=#FA8072
| 1 ||  || MCA || 17.9 || 1.5 km || multiple || 2002–2020 || 12 Dec 2020 || 318 || align=left | Disc.: LINEAR || 
|- id="2002 VR107" bgcolor=#d6d6d6
| 0 ||  || MBA-O || 16.62 || 2.6 km || multiple || 2002–2021 || 12 May 2021 || 187 || align=left | Disc.: LINEAR || 
|- id="2002 VZ111" bgcolor=#E9E9E9
| 0 ||  || MBA-M || 17.33 || 1.4 km || multiple || 2002–2021 || 31 Mar 2021 || 185 || align=left | Disc.: LPL/Spacewatch IIAlt.: 2012 BT33 || 
|- id="2002 VB112" bgcolor=#fefefe
| 0 ||  || MBA-I || 17.7 || data-sort-value="0.86" | 860 m || multiple || 2002–2021 || 05 Jan 2021 || 172 || align=left | Disc.: LPL/Spacewatch II || 
|- id="2002 VS114" bgcolor=#E9E9E9
| 0 ||  || MBA-M || 16.9 || 1.8 km || multiple || 2002–2020 || 26 Jan 2020 || 189 || align=left | Disc.: NEAT || 
|- id="2002 VU114" bgcolor=#FFC2E0
| 3 ||  || APO || 22.8 || data-sort-value="0.098" | 98 m || multiple || 2002–2020 || 18 Nov 2020 || 53 || align=left | Disc.: LINEAR || 
|- id="2002 VH115" bgcolor=#fefefe
| 0 ||  || MBA-I || 18.5 || data-sort-value="0.59" | 590 m || multiple || 2002–2019 || 29 Jul 2019 || 59 || align=left | Disc.: LINEARAlt.: 2009 WL148 || 
|- id="2002 VZ115" bgcolor=#d6d6d6
| 0 ||  || MBA-O || 15.5 || 4.4 km || multiple || 2001–2021 || 07 Jun 2021 || 263 || align=left | Disc.: LINEARAlt.: 2016 GJ183 || 
|- id="2002 VH116" bgcolor=#d6d6d6
| 3 ||  || MBA-O || 16.7 || 2.5 km || multiple || 2002–2014 || 28 Jan 2014 || 25 || align=left | Disc.: LINEAR || 
|- id="2002 VR116" bgcolor=#fefefe
| 0 ||  || MBA-I || 17.4 || data-sort-value="0.98" | 980 m || multiple || 2002–2021 || 07 Jan 2021 || 151 || align=left | Disc.: NEAT || 
|- id="2002 VW116" bgcolor=#E9E9E9
| 0 ||  || MBA-M || 17.1 || 1.6 km || multiple || 2002–2021 || 17 Jan 2021 || 159 || align=left | Disc.: NEAT || 
|- id="2002 VX116" bgcolor=#E9E9E9
| 0 ||  || MBA-M || 17.2 || 1.5 km || multiple || 2002–2021 || 16 Jan 2021 || 203 || align=left | Disc.: NEATAlt.: 2008 AA19 || 
|- id="2002 VF117" bgcolor=#E9E9E9
| 0 ||  || MBA-M || 16.7 || 2.5 km || multiple || 2002–2021 || 12 Jan 2021 || 102 || align=left | Disc.: NEAT || 
|- id="2002 VX117" bgcolor=#fefefe
| 0 ||  || MBA-I || 16.64 || 1.4 km || multiple || 2002–2021 || 17 Apr 2021 || 144 || align=left | Disc.: LINEARAlt.: 2010 DF60, 2015 PB244 || 
|- id="2002 VG118" bgcolor=#fefefe
| 1 ||  || MBA-I || 18.1 || data-sort-value="0.71" | 710 m || multiple || 2002–2018 || 07 Mar 2018 || 43 || align=left | Disc.: LINEAR || 
|- id="2002 VJ118" bgcolor=#fefefe
| 0 ||  || HUN || 17.65 || data-sort-value="0.88" | 880 m || multiple || 2002–2021 || 02 Dec 2021 || 197 || align=left | Disc.: LINEAR || 
|- id="2002 VC122" bgcolor=#E9E9E9
| 0 ||  || MBA-M || 17.5 || 1.3 km || multiple || 2002–2020 || 22 Dec 2020 || 79 || align=left | Disc.: NEAT || 
|- id="2002 VJ123" bgcolor=#E9E9E9
| 0 ||  || MBA-M || 17.4 || 1.4 km || multiple || 2002–2019 || 27 Oct 2019 || 168 || align=left | Disc.: NEAT || 
|- id="2002 VP123" bgcolor=#d6d6d6
| 0 ||  || MBA-O || 16.3 || 3.1 km || multiple || 2002–2018 || 13 Dec 2018 || 54 || align=left | Disc.: NEAT || 
|- id="2002 VA125" bgcolor=#fefefe
| 0 ||  || MBA-I || 17.56 || data-sort-value="0.91" | 910 m || multiple || 2002–2022 || 01 Jan 2022 || 312 || align=left | Disc.: LINEAR || 
|- id="2002 VE125" bgcolor=#E9E9E9
| 0 ||  || MBA-M || 16.9 || 1.8 km || multiple || 2002–2021 || 13 Jan 2021 || 137 || align=left | Disc.: NEAT || 
|- id="2002 VU125" bgcolor=#fefefe
| 0 ||  || HUN || 18.71 || data-sort-value="0.54" | 540 m || multiple || 2002–2022 || 07 Jan 2022 || 95 || align=left | Disc.: NEAT || 
|- id="2002 VA126" bgcolor=#E9E9E9
| 0 ||  || MBA-M || 17.4 || 1.4 km || multiple || 2002–2020 || 19 Jan 2020 || 160 || align=left | Disc.: NEAT || 
|- id="2002 VV128" bgcolor=#d6d6d6
| 0 ||  || MBA-O || 16.5 || 2.8 km || multiple || 2002–2018 || 10 Oct 2018 || 60 || align=left | Disc.: LPL/Spacewatch II || 
|- id="2002 VA129" bgcolor=#d6d6d6
| 0 ||  || MBA-O || 16.7 || 2.5 km || multiple || 2002–2021 || 24 Jan 2021 || 116 || align=left | Disc.: LINEAR || 
|- id="2002 VM129" bgcolor=#d6d6d6
| 1 ||  || HIL || 16.22 || 3.2 km || multiple || 2002–2018 || 17 Nov 2018 || 55 || align=left | Disc.: LPL/Spacewatch II || 
|- id="2002 VC130" bgcolor=#fefefe
| 0 ||  || MBA-I || 18.5 || data-sort-value="0.59" | 590 m || multiple || 2002–2021 || 17 Jan 2021 || 44 || align=left | Disc.: Kitt Peak Obs.Alt.: 2011 FF104 || 
|- id="2002 VD130" bgcolor=#C2E0FF
| 1 ||  || TNO || 7.5 || 114 km || multiple || 2002–2020 || 14 Feb 2020 || 27 || align=left | Disc.: Kitt Peak Obs.LoUTNOs, twotino || 
|- id="2002 VE130" bgcolor=#C2E0FF
| 4 ||  || TNO || 6.38 || 176 km || multiple || 2002–2021 || 11 Jan 2021 || 21 || align=left | Disc.: Kitt Peak Obs.LoUTNOs, cubewano (cold) || 
|- id="2002 VF130" bgcolor=#C2E0FF
| 3 ||  || TNO || 6.8 || 137 km || multiple || 2002–2020 || 14 Nov 2020 || 24 || align=left | Disc.: Kitt Peak Obs.LoUTNOs, other TNO, binary: 119 km || 
|- id="2002 VV130" bgcolor=#C2E0FF
| 5 ||  || TNO || 7.52 || 113 km || multiple || 2002–2021 || 13 Sep 2021 || 22 || align=left | Disc.: Kitt Peak Obs.LoUTNOs, res3:5, BR-mag: 1.92; taxonomy: RR || 
|- id="2002 VW130" bgcolor=#C2E0FF
| E ||  || TNO || 6.9 || 143 km || single || 25 days || 02 Dec 2002 || 5 || align=left | Disc.: Kitt Peak Obs.LoUTNOs, cubewano? || 
|- id="2002 VX130" bgcolor=#C2E0FF
| 3 ||  || TNO || 8.35 || 101 km || multiple || 2002–2021 || 05 Nov 2021 || 24 || align=left | Disc.: Kitt Peak Obs.LoUTNOs, plutino || 
|- id="2002 VY130" bgcolor=#C2E0FF
| E ||  || TNO || 8.4 || 99 km || single || 24 days || 01 Dec 2002 || 5 || align=left | Disc.: Kitt Peak Obs.LoUTNOs, plutino? || 
|- id="2002 VZ130" bgcolor=#C2E0FF
| E ||  || TNO || 7.3 || 119 km || single || 23 days || 02 Dec 2002 || 4 || align=left | Disc.: Kitt Peak Obs.LoUTNOs, cubewano? || 
|- id="2002 VB131" bgcolor=#C2E0FF
| 2 ||  || TNO || 6.4 || 174 km || multiple || 2002–2013 || 07 Oct 2013 || 25 || align=left | Disc.: Kitt Peak Obs.LoUTNOs, cubewano (cold) || 
|- id="2002 VC131" bgcolor=#C2E0FF
| E ||  || TNO || 6.4 || 180 km || single || 24 days || 01 Dec 2002 || 5 || align=left | Disc.: Kitt Peak Obs.LoUTNOs, cubewano? || 
|- id="2002 VD131" bgcolor=#C2E0FF
| 3 ||  || TNO || 6.6 || 159 km || multiple || 2002–2020 || 20 Oct 2020 || 19 || align=left | Disc.: Kitt Peak Obs.LoUTNOs, cubewano (cold), BR-mag: 1.21 || 
|- id="2002 VE131" bgcolor=#C2E0FF
| E ||  || TNO || 6.5 || 209 km || single || 25 days || 02 Dec 2002 || 5 || align=left | Disc.: Kitt Peak Obs.LoUTNOs, other TNO || 
|- id="2002 VF131" bgcolor=#C2E0FF
| 3 ||  || TNO || 6.7 || 152 km || multiple || 2002–2020 || 30 Jan 2020 || 13 || align=left | Disc.: Kitt Peak Obs.LoUTNOs, cubewano (cold) || 
|- id="2002 VG131" bgcolor=#C7FF8F
| – ||  || CEN || 11.3 || 31 km || single || 26 days || 05 Dec 2002 || 6 || align=left | Disc.: Kitt Peak Obs. || 
|- id="2002 VQ132" bgcolor=#E9E9E9
| 0 ||  || MBA-M || 16.7 || 1.9 km || multiple || 2002–2021 || 08 Jan 2021 || 231 || align=left | Disc.: La Palma Obs. || 
|- id="2002 VV132" bgcolor=#fefefe
| 0 ||  || HUN || 17.82 || data-sort-value="0.81" | 810 m || multiple || 2002–2022 || 09 Jan 2022 || 210 || align=left | Disc.: LINEAR || 
|- id="2002 VA133" bgcolor=#E9E9E9
| 0 ||  || MBA-M || 18.0 || 1.4 km || multiple || 2002–2020 || 15 Oct 2020 || 33 || align=left | Disc.: SpacewatchAdded on 17 January 2021 || 
|- id="2002 VL133" bgcolor=#E9E9E9
| 0 ||  || MBA-M || 17.77 || 1.2 km || multiple || 2002–2021 || 09 Apr 2021 || 48 || align=left | Disc.: LPL/Spacewatch II || 
|- id="2002 VE134" bgcolor=#d6d6d6
| 0 ||  || MBA-O || 16.1 || 3.4 km || multiple || 2002–2021 || 05 Jun 2021 || 201 || align=left | Disc.: LINEAR || 
|- id="2002 VZ134" bgcolor=#d6d6d6
| 0 ||  || MBA-O || 16.15 || 3.3 km || multiple || 2002–2021 || 17 Apr 2021 || 149 || align=left | Disc.: LINEARAlt.: 2010 LC8 || 
|- id="2002 VS135" bgcolor=#d6d6d6
| 1 ||  || MBA-O || 17.5 || 1.8 km || multiple || 2002–2017 || 19 Aug 2017 || 32 || align=left | Disc.: Kitt Peak Obs.Added on 22 July 2020Alt.: 2017 PC40 || 
|- id="2002 VT135" bgcolor=#d6d6d6
| 1 ||  || MBA-O || 17.4 || 1.8 km || multiple || 2002–2019 || 25 Jan 2019 || 43 || align=left | Disc.: Kitt Peak Obs. || 
|- id="2002 VE136" bgcolor=#E9E9E9
| 0 ||  || MBA-M || 17.55 || 1.7 km || multiple || 2002–2022 || 10 Jan 2022 || 66 || align=left | Disc.: Kitt Peak Obs.Alt.: 2016 UQ12 || 
|- id="2002 VG136" bgcolor=#d6d6d6
| 0 ||  || MBA-O || 17.1 || 2.1 km || multiple || 2002–2021 || 15 Jan 2021 || 38 || align=left | Disc.: Kitt Peak Obs. || 
|- id="2002 VC137" bgcolor=#d6d6d6
| 0 ||  || MBA-O || 16.32 || 3.0 km || multiple || 1996–2021 || 31 Mar 2021 || 126 || align=left | Disc.: Mount Nyukasa Stn. || 
|- id="2002 VD137" bgcolor=#d6d6d6
| 0 ||  || MBA-O || 16.39 || 2.9 km || multiple || 2002–2021 || 11 Apr 2021 || 174 || align=left | Disc.: Mount Nyukasa Stn. || 
|- id="2002 VE137" bgcolor=#d6d6d6
| 0 ||  || MBA-O || 16.59 || 2.7 km || multiple || 2002–2021 || 13 May 2021 || 166 || align=left | Disc.: Mount Nyukasa Stn.Alt.: 2015 BE284 || 
|- id="2002 VF137" bgcolor=#fefefe
| 0 ||  || MBA-I || 18.70 || data-sort-value="0.54" | 540 m || multiple || 1995–2021 || 07 Apr 2021 || 75 || align=left | Disc.: SpacewatchAlt.: 1995 SM23 || 
|- id="2002 VG137" bgcolor=#fefefe
| 0 ||  || MBA-I || 18.2 || data-sort-value="0.68" | 680 m || multiple || 2000–2021 || 04 Jan 2021 || 63 || align=left | Disc.: Mount Nyukasa Stn.Alt.: 2009 TP33 || 
|- id="2002 VL137" bgcolor=#fefefe
| 0 ||  || MBA-I || 18.9 || data-sort-value="0.49" | 490 m || multiple || 2002–2020 || 10 Dec 2020 || 64 || align=left | Disc.: Mount Nyukasa Stn. || 
|- id="2002 VV137" bgcolor=#fefefe
| 0 ||  || MBA-I || 18.4 || data-sort-value="0.62" | 620 m || multiple || 2002–2020 || 20 Oct 2020 || 114 || align=left | Disc.: NEATAlt.: 2007 BL14, 2015 HP73 || 
|- id="2002 VW137" bgcolor=#fefefe
| 0 ||  || MBA-I || 18.0 || data-sort-value="0.75" | 750 m || multiple || 2002–2019 || 24 Dec 2019 || 115 || align=left | Disc.: NEATAlt.: 2012 PN32, 2015 HK164 || 
|- id="2002 VX137" bgcolor=#E9E9E9
| 0 ||  || MBA-M || 17.2 || 2.0 km || multiple || 2002–2021 || 06 Jan 2021 || 123 || align=left | Disc.: NEATAlt.: 2011 UE311 || 
|- id="2002 VD138" bgcolor=#C2E0FF
| 4 ||  || TNO || 8.36 || 101 km || multiple || 1999–2020 || 09 Dec 2020 || 19 || align=left | Disc.: Kitt Peak Obs.LoUTNOs, plutino || 
|- id="2002 VL138" bgcolor=#E9E9E9
| 0 ||  || MBA-M || 18.12 || data-sort-value="0.71" | 710 m || multiple || 2002–2021 || 08 May 2021 || 77 || align=left | Disc.: LPL/Spacewatch IIAlt.: 2010 SH42 || 
|- id="2002 VQ138" bgcolor=#d6d6d6
| 0 ||  || MBA-O || 17.08 || 2.1 km || multiple || 2002–2021 || 18 May 2021 || 74 || align=left | Disc.: NEAT || 
|- id="2002 VB139" bgcolor=#E9E9E9
| 0 ||  || MBA-M || 17.66 || data-sort-value="0.87" | 870 m || multiple || 2002–2021 || 30 May 2021 || 195 || align=left | Disc.: NEATAlt.: 2012 DC77 || 
|- id="2002 VO139" bgcolor=#d6d6d6
| 1 ||  || MBA-O || 16.7 || 2.5 km || multiple || 2002–2020 || 31 Jan 2020 || 126 || align=left | Disc.: NEATAlt.: 2015 DL191 || 
|- id="2002 VB140" bgcolor=#E9E9E9
| 0 ||  || MBA-M || 17.2 || 1.1 km || multiple || 2002–2020 || 01 Feb 2020 || 85 || align=left | Disc.: NEAT || 
|- id="2002 VJ140" bgcolor=#d6d6d6
| 0 ||  || MBA-O || 16.27 || 3.1 km || multiple || 2002–2021 || 09 Apr 2021 || 157 || align=left | Disc.: NEATAlt.: 2010 LP27, 2011 KE39 || 
|- id="2002 VP140" bgcolor=#E9E9E9
| 0 ||  || MBA-M || 17.9 || 1.1 km || multiple || 2002–2019 || 24 Aug 2019 || 56 || align=left | Disc.: NEAT || 
|- id="2002 VZ140" bgcolor=#E9E9E9
| 0 ||  || MBA-M || 17.69 || data-sort-value="0.86" | 860 m || multiple || 2002–2021 || 03 May 2021 || 108 || align=left | Disc.: SDSSAlt.: 2010 RV38, 2014 OV56 || 
|- id="2002 VE142" bgcolor=#d6d6d6
| 0 ||  || MBA-O || 16.08 || 3.4 km || multiple || 2002–2021 || 12 May 2021 || 185 || align=left | Disc.: NEATAlt.: 2013 YF22 || 
|- id="2002 VF142" bgcolor=#E9E9E9
| 3 ||  || MBA-M || 18.6 || data-sort-value="0.80" | 800 m || multiple || 2002–2019 || 20 Dec 2019 || 42 || align=left | Disc.: NEAT || 
|- id="2002 VV142" bgcolor=#d6d6d6
| 0 ||  || MBA-O || 16.76 || 2.5 km || multiple || 2002–2021 || 17 Apr 2021 || 88 || align=left | Disc.: NEATAlt.: 2013 UZ13 || 
|- id="2002 VC143" bgcolor=#E9E9E9
| 0 ||  || MBA-M || 16.92 || 2.3 km || multiple || 2002–2022 || 27 Jan 2022 || 164 || align=left | Disc.: NEATAlt.: 2011 SP184 || 
|- id="2002 VJ143" bgcolor=#fefefe
| 0 ||  || MBA-I || 17.8 || data-sort-value="0.82" | 820 m || multiple || 2002–2021 || 22 Jan 2021 || 101 || align=left | Disc.: NEAT || 
|- id="2002 VM143" bgcolor=#fefefe
| 0 ||  || MBA-I || 18.52 || data-sort-value="0.59" | 590 m || multiple || 1995–2021 || 14 Apr 2021 || 52 || align=left | Disc.: NEATAlt.: 2007 EL61 || 
|- id="2002 VR143" bgcolor=#fefefe
| 1 ||  || MBA-I || 18.8 || data-sort-value="0.52" | 520 m || multiple || 2002–2020 || 15 Dec 2020 || 57 || align=left | Disc.: NEAT || 
|- id="2002 VU143" bgcolor=#d6d6d6
| 0 ||  || MBA-O || 16.12 || 3.3 km || multiple || 1994–2021 || 12 May 2021 || 161 || align=left | Disc.: NEAT || 
|- id="2002 VE144" bgcolor=#fefefe
| 1 ||  || MBA-I || 18.5 || data-sort-value="0.59" | 590 m || multiple || 2002–2019 || 17 Sep 2019 || 49 || align=left | Disc.: NEATAlt.: 2009 XN || 
|- id="2002 VJ144" bgcolor=#E9E9E9
| 1 ||  || MBA-M || 18.4 || data-sort-value="0.88" | 880 m || multiple || 2002–2019 || 27 Nov 2019 || 74 || align=left | Disc.: NEATAlt.: 2015 XU115 || 
|- id="2002 VL144" bgcolor=#fefefe
| 1 ||  || MBA-I || 18.9 || data-sort-value="0.49" | 490 m || multiple || 2002–2019 || 24 Oct 2019 || 44 || align=left | Disc.: NEAT || 
|- id="2002 VM144" bgcolor=#fefefe
| 1 ||  || MBA-I || 18.3 || data-sort-value="0.65" | 650 m || multiple || 2002–2017 || 15 Dec 2017 || 83 || align=left | Disc.: NEAT || 
|- id="2002 VO144" bgcolor=#fefefe
| 2 ||  || MBA-I || 18.7 || data-sort-value="0.54" | 540 m || multiple || 2002–2021 || 18 Jan 2021 || 47 || align=left | Disc.: NEAT || 
|- id="2002 VP144" bgcolor=#fefefe
| 0 ||  || MBA-I || 18.52 || data-sort-value="0.59" | 590 m || multiple || 2002–2021 || 15 Apr 2021 || 69 || align=left | Disc.: NEAT || 
|- id="2002 VQ144" bgcolor=#fefefe
| 0 ||  || MBA-I || 17.6 || data-sort-value="0.90" | 900 m || multiple || 2002–2021 || 10 Jan 2021 || 156 || align=left | Disc.: NEAT || 
|- id="2002 VT144" bgcolor=#fefefe
| 0 ||  || MBA-I || 17.68 || data-sort-value="0.87" | 870 m || multiple || 2002–2021 || 30 Nov 2021 || 141 || align=left | Disc.: NEATAlt.: 2015 DL172 || 
|- id="2002 VU144" bgcolor=#E9E9E9
| 0 ||  || MBA-M || 17.1 || 2.1 km || multiple || 2002–2021 || 14 Jan 2021 || 114 || align=left | Disc.: NEATAlt.: 2011 UD242 || 
|- id="2002 VV144" bgcolor=#C2FFFF
| 0 ||  || JT || 13.7 || 10 km || multiple || 2001–2021 || 11 Jun 2021 || 219 || align=left | Disc.: NEATTrojan camp (L5)Alt.: 2012 PL19 || 
|- id="2002 VX144" bgcolor=#d6d6d6
| 1 ||  || MBA-O || 16.8 || 2.4 km || multiple || 2002–2019 || 21 Dec 2019 || 77 || align=left | Disc.: NEATAlt.: 2015 AJ11 || 
|- id="2002 VA145" bgcolor=#E9E9E9
| 0 ||  || MBA-M || 17.7 || 1.2 km || multiple || 2002–2019 || 24 Nov 2019 || 69 || align=left | Disc.: NEATAlt.: 2010 PB90 || 
|- id="2002 VC145" bgcolor=#fefefe
| 0 ||  || MBA-I || 18.0 || data-sort-value="0.75" | 750 m || multiple || 2002–2020 || 20 Oct 2020 || 188 || align=left | Disc.: NEATAlt.: 2013 XG2 || 
|- id="2002 VK145" bgcolor=#fefefe
| 0 ||  || MBA-I || 18.12 || data-sort-value="0.71" | 710 m || multiple || 1992–2021 || 11 May 2021 || 99 || align=left | Disc.: NEAT || 
|- id="2002 VN145" bgcolor=#d6d6d6
| 0 ||  || MBA-O || 16.29 || 3.1 km || multiple || 1991–2021 || 06 Apr 2021 || 111 || align=left | Disc.: NEAT || 
|- id="2002 VP145" bgcolor=#E9E9E9
| 0 ||  || MBA-M || 17.5 || 1.8 km || multiple || 2002–2021 || 16 Jan 2021 || 120 || align=left | Disc.: NEATAlt.: 2015 TU33 || 
|- id="2002 VU145" bgcolor=#fefefe
| 2 ||  || MBA-I || 18.4 || data-sort-value="0.62" | 620 m || multiple || 2002–2019 || 28 Jan 2019 || 69 || align=left | Disc.: NEAT || 
|- id="2002 VZ145" bgcolor=#fefefe
| 0 ||  || MBA-I || 18.3 || data-sort-value="0.65" | 650 m || multiple || 2002–2021 || 04 Jan 2021 || 112 || align=left | Disc.: NEAT || 
|- id="2002 VE146" bgcolor=#d6d6d6
| 2 ||  || MBA-O || 17.1 || 2.1 km || multiple || 2002–2019 || 24 Nov 2019 || 53 || align=left | Disc.: NEATAlt.: 2019 SW12 || 
|- id="2002 VN146" bgcolor=#fefefe
| 1 ||  || MBA-I || 18.3 || data-sort-value="0.65" | 650 m || multiple || 2002–2019 || 21 Sep 2019 || 68 || align=left | Disc.: NEAT || 
|- id="2002 VT146" bgcolor=#E9E9E9
| 0 ||  || MBA-M || 16.6 || 2.7 km || multiple || 2002–2021 || 03 Jan 2021 || 158 || align=left | Disc.: NEATAlt.: 2011 UX8 || 
|- id="2002 VU146" bgcolor=#fefefe
| 0 ||  || MBA-I || 18.4 || data-sort-value="0.62" | 620 m || multiple || 2002–2020 || 17 Dec 2020 || 113 || align=left | Disc.: NEAT || 
|- id="2002 VY146" bgcolor=#d6d6d6
| 0 ||  || MBA-O || 16.9 || 2.3 km || multiple || 2002–2020 || 22 Dec 2020 || 86 || align=left | Disc.: NEAT || 
|- id="2002 VZ146" bgcolor=#d6d6d6
| 0 ||  || MBA-O || 16.74 || 2.5 km || multiple || 2002–2021 || 14 May 2021 || 87 || align=left | Disc.: NEAT || 
|- id="2002 VL147" bgcolor=#E9E9E9
| 0 ||  || MBA-M || 17.47 || 1.8 km || multiple || 2002–2022 || 21 Jan 2022 || 43 || align=left | Disc.: NEAT || 
|- id="2002 VP147" bgcolor=#E9E9E9
| 0 ||  || MBA-M || 16.2 || 3.2 km || multiple || 2002–2021 || 03 Jan 2021 || 168 || align=left | Disc.: NEAT || 
|- id="2002 VR147" bgcolor=#E9E9E9
| 0 ||  || MBA-M || 17.7 || 1.2 km || multiple || 2002–2020 || 10 Dec 2020 || 93 || align=left | Disc.: NEATAlt.: 2015 UT6 || 
|- id="2002 VV147" bgcolor=#E9E9E9
| 1 ||  || MBA-M || 18.2 || data-sort-value="0.96" | 960 m || multiple || 2002–2020 || 19 Jan 2020 || 73 || align=left | Disc.: NEAT || 
|- id="2002 VW147" bgcolor=#E9E9E9
| 0 ||  || MBA-M || 17.5 || data-sort-value="0.94" | 940 m || multiple || 2002–2019 || 19 Dec 2019 || 48 || align=left | Disc.: NEAT || 
|- id="2002 VX147" bgcolor=#fefefe
| 0 ||  || MBA-I || 19.30 || data-sort-value="0.41" | 410 m || multiple || 2002–2021 || 08 Sep 2021 || 85 || align=left | Disc.: NEAT || 
|- id="2002 VY147" bgcolor=#d6d6d6
| 0 ||  || MBA-O || 16.17 || 3.2 km || multiple || 1991–2021 || 17 Apr 2021 || 188 || align=left | Disc.: NEAT || 
|- id="2002 VA148" bgcolor=#E9E9E9
| 0 ||  || MBA-M || 16.76 || 1.3 km || multiple || 2002–2021 || 19 May 2021 || 220 || align=left | Disc.: NEAT || 
|- id="2002 VB148" bgcolor=#fefefe
| 0 ||  || MBA-I || 17.84 || data-sort-value="0.80" | 800 m || multiple || 2002–2022 || 25 Jan 2022 || 157 || align=left | Disc.: NEAT || 
|- id="2002 VC148" bgcolor=#fefefe
| 0 ||  || MBA-I || 17.23 || 1.1 km || multiple || 2002–2022 || 25 Jan 2022 || 162 || align=left | Disc.: NEATAlt.: 2015 KS21 || 
|- id="2002 VD148" bgcolor=#E9E9E9
| 0 ||  || MBA-M || 17.7 || data-sort-value="0.86" | 860 m || multiple || 2002–2020 || 26 Feb 2020 || 132 || align=left | Disc.: NEATAlt.: 2012 FE56 || 
|- id="2002 VG148" bgcolor=#fefefe
| 0 ||  || MBA-I || 17.9 || data-sort-value="0.78" | 780 m || multiple || 2002–2020 || 09 Dec 2020 || 126 || align=left | Disc.: NEATAlt.: 2009 SY331 || 
|- id="2002 VH148" bgcolor=#fefefe
| 0 ||  || MBA-I || 17.9 || data-sort-value="0.78" | 780 m || multiple || 2002–2021 || 05 Jan 2021 || 176 || align=left | Disc.: NEAT || 
|- id="2002 VK148" bgcolor=#E9E9E9
| 0 ||  || MBA-M || 17.1 || 1.1 km || multiple || 2002–2020 || 12 Apr 2020 || 170 || align=left | Disc.: NEATAlt.: 2010 VL37 || 
|- id="2002 VM148" bgcolor=#d6d6d6
| 0 ||  || MBA-O || 16.50 || 2.8 km || multiple || 2002–2021 || 09 May 2021 || 150 || align=left | Disc.: NEAT || 
|- id="2002 VB149" bgcolor=#d6d6d6
| 0 ||  || MBA-O || 16.37 || 3.0 km || multiple || 2002–2021 || 13 Apr 2021 || 139 || align=left | Disc.: NEATAlt.: 2018 RO27 || 
|- id="2002 VC149" bgcolor=#d6d6d6
| 0 ||  || MBA-O || 16.30 || 3.1 km || multiple || 2002–2021 || 09 Apr 2021 || 97 || align=left | Disc.: NEATAlt.: 2014 CC15 || 
|- id="2002 VD149" bgcolor=#E9E9E9
| 0 ||  || MBA-M || 17.9 || data-sort-value="0.78" | 780 m || multiple || 2002–2020 || 31 Jan 2020 || 82 || align=left | Disc.: NEATAlt.: 2006 VP143 || 
|- id="2002 VE149" bgcolor=#d6d6d6
| 0 ||  || MBA-O || 16.6 || 2.7 km || multiple || 2002–2021 || 11 May 2021 || 272 || align=left | Disc.: NEAT || 
|- id="2002 VF149" bgcolor=#d6d6d6
| 0 ||  || MBA-O || 16.9 || 2.3 km || multiple || 2002–2019 || 01 Feb 2019 || 50 || align=left | Disc.: NEATAlt.: 2014 AP21 || 
|- id="2002 VG149" bgcolor=#E9E9E9
| 0 ||  || MBA-M || 17.0 || 1.7 km || multiple || 2002–2019 || 27 Nov 2019 || 79 || align=left | Disc.: NEAT || 
|- id="2002 VH149" bgcolor=#d6d6d6
| 0 ||  || MBA-O || 16.61 || 2.7 km || multiple || 2002–2021 || 06 Apr 2021 || 90 || align=left | Disc.: NEATAlt.: 2015 FV363 || 
|- id="2002 VJ149" bgcolor=#d6d6d6
| 0 ||  || MBA-O || 16.02 || 3.9 km || multiple || 1991–2021 || 09 May 2021 || 206 || align=left | Disc.: NEATAlt.: 2010 BT20, 2010 NK92 || 
|- id="2002 VK149" bgcolor=#E9E9E9
| 0 ||  || MBA-M || 17.1 || 1.6 km || multiple || 2002–2021 || 16 Jan 2021 || 88 || align=left | Disc.: NEAT || 
|- id="2002 VL149" bgcolor=#fefefe
| 0 ||  || MBA-I || 17.9 || data-sort-value="0.78" | 780 m || multiple || 2002–2020 || 22 Mar 2020 || 94 || align=left | Disc.: NEATAlt.: 2015 RQ118 || 
|- id="2002 VM149" bgcolor=#d6d6d6
| 0 ||  || MBA-O || 16.74 || 2.5 km || multiple || 2002–2021 || 08 May 2021 || 70 || align=left | Disc.: NEATAlt.: 2015 FA26 || 
|- id="2002 VN149" bgcolor=#d6d6d6
| 0 ||  || HIL || 15.4 || 4.6 km || multiple || 2001–2020 || 29 Jan 2020 || 98 || align=left | Disc.: NEAT || 
|- id="2002 VO149" bgcolor=#d6d6d6
| 0 ||  || MBA-O || 16.47 || 2.8 km || multiple || 2002–2021 || 09 Apr 2021 || 119 || align=left | Disc.: NEATAlt.: 2015 BN283 || 
|- id="2002 VP149" bgcolor=#E9E9E9
| 1 ||  || MBA-M || 17.5 || data-sort-value="0.94" | 940 m || multiple || 2002–2020 || 22 May 2020 || 119 || align=left | Disc.: NEATAlt.: 2010 VC210, 2014 UM110 || 
|- id="2002 VR149" bgcolor=#d6d6d6
| 0 ||  || MBA-O || 16.82 || 2.4 km || multiple || 2002–2021 || 15 Apr 2021 || 78 || align=left | Disc.: NEAT || 
|- id="2002 VS149" bgcolor=#fefefe
| 0 ||  || MBA-I || 18.08 || data-sort-value="0.72" | 720 m || multiple || 2002–2021 || 15 Apr 2021 || 117 || align=left | Disc.: NEATAlt.: 2016 YN7 || 
|- id="2002 VT149" bgcolor=#FA8072
| 0 ||  || HUN || 18.49 || data-sort-value="0.60" | 600 m || multiple || 2002–2021 || 12 Apr 2021 || 78 || align=left | Disc.: NEATAlt.: 2016 AM193 || 
|- id="2002 VY149" bgcolor=#fefefe
| 0 ||  || MBA-I || 16.6 || 1.4 km || multiple || 2002–2020 || 16 Nov 2020 || 182 || align=left | Disc.: Kitt Peak Obs. || 
|- id="2002 VZ149" bgcolor=#fefefe
| 0 ||  || MBA-I || 17.90 || data-sort-value="0.78" | 780 m || multiple || 2002–2022 || 05 Jan 2022 || 126 || align=left | Disc.: AMOSAlt.: 2011 BM7 || 
|- id="2002 VA150" bgcolor=#fefefe
| 0 ||  || MBA-I || 17.8 || data-sort-value="0.82" | 820 m || multiple || 2002–2021 || 05 Jan 2021 || 211 || align=left | Disc.: Kitt Peak Obs. || 
|- id="2002 VC150" bgcolor=#fefefe
| 0 ||  || MBA-I || 17.62 || data-sort-value="0.89" | 890 m || multiple || 2002–2021 || 03 May 2021 || 170 || align=left | Disc.: LPL/Spacewatch II || 
|- id="2002 VD150" bgcolor=#fefefe
| 0 ||  || MBA-I || 18.1 || data-sort-value="0.71" | 710 m || multiple || 2002–2020 || 05 Nov 2020 || 84 || align=left | Disc.: LPL/Spacewatch II || 
|- id="2002 VE150" bgcolor=#fefefe
| 0 ||  || MBA-I || 18.0 || data-sort-value="0.75" | 750 m || multiple || 2002–2020 || 15 Oct 2020 || 92 || align=left | Disc.: LPL/Spacewatch II || 
|- id="2002 VF150" bgcolor=#d6d6d6
| 0 ||  || MBA-O || 16.2 || 3.2 km || multiple || 2002–2020 || 21 Apr 2020 || 167 || align=left | Disc.: NEAT || 
|- id="2002 VG150" bgcolor=#fefefe
| 0 ||  || MBA-I || 18.00 || data-sort-value="0.75" | 750 m || multiple || 2002–2021 || 13 May 2021 || 123 || align=left | Disc.: LPL/Spacewatch II || 
|- id="2002 VH150" bgcolor=#E9E9E9
| 0 ||  || MBA-M || 17.0 || 1.7 km || multiple || 2002–2021 || 18 Jan 2021 || 113 || align=left | Disc.: LPL/Spacewatch II || 
|- id="2002 VJ150" bgcolor=#fefefe
| 0 ||  || MBA-I || 17.9 || data-sort-value="0.78" | 780 m || multiple || 2002–2020 || 15 Dec 2020 || 102 || align=left | Disc.: Kitt Peak Obs. || 
|- id="2002 VK150" bgcolor=#E9E9E9
| 0 ||  || MBA-M || 17.7 || 1.2 km || multiple || 2002–2021 || 18 Jan 2021 || 68 || align=left | Disc.: Kitt Peak Obs. || 
|- id="2002 VM150" bgcolor=#fefefe
| 0 ||  || MBA-I || 19.01 || data-sort-value="0.47" | 470 m || multiple || 2002–2021 || 12 May 2021 || 63 || align=left | Disc.: LPL/Spacewatch II || 
|- id="2002 VN150" bgcolor=#d6d6d6
| 0 ||  || MBA-O || 16.6 || 2.7 km || multiple || 2002–2021 || 18 Jan 2021 || 71 || align=left | Disc.: Kitt Peak Obs. || 
|- id="2002 VO150" bgcolor=#fefefe
| 0 ||  || MBA-I || 18.21 || data-sort-value="0.68" | 680 m || multiple || 2002–2021 || 07 Jun 2021 || 84 || align=left | Disc.: NEAT || 
|- id="2002 VP150" bgcolor=#fefefe
| 0 ||  || MBA-I || 17.8 || data-sort-value="0.82" | 820 m || multiple || 2002–2021 || 18 Jan 2021 || 103 || align=left | Disc.: NEAT || 
|- id="2002 VQ150" bgcolor=#E9E9E9
| 0 ||  || MBA-M || 16.9 || 1.8 km || multiple || 2002–2021 || 17 Jan 2021 || 192 || align=left | Disc.: NEAT || 
|- id="2002 VR150" bgcolor=#d6d6d6
| 0 ||  || MBA-O || 16.9 || 2.3 km || multiple || 2002–2020 || 27 Apr 2020 || 62 || align=left | Disc.: LPL/Spacewatch II || 
|- id="2002 VT150" bgcolor=#fefefe
| 0 ||  || MBA-I || 18.5 || data-sort-value="0.59" | 590 m || multiple || 2002–2020 || 13 Sep 2020 || 78 || align=left | Disc.: LPL/Spacewatch II || 
|- id="2002 VW150" bgcolor=#E9E9E9
| 0 ||  || MBA-M || 16.9 || 1.8 km || multiple || 2002–2021 || 07 Jun 2021 || 171 || align=left | Disc.: LPL/Spacewatch II || 
|- id="2002 VY150" bgcolor=#fefefe
| 0 ||  || MBA-I || 19.05 || data-sort-value="0.46" | 460 m || multiple || 2002–2022 || 06 Jan 2022 || 76 || align=left | Disc.: LPL/Spacewatch II || 
|- id="2002 VA151" bgcolor=#fefefe
| 0 ||  || MBA-I || 17.9 || data-sort-value="0.78" | 780 m || multiple || 2002–2020 || 23 Nov 2020 || 67 || align=left | Disc.: Kitt Peak Obs. || 
|- id="2002 VD151" bgcolor=#fefefe
| 0 ||  || MBA-I || 18.6 || data-sort-value="0.57" | 570 m || multiple || 2002–2017 || 26 Nov 2017 || 40 || align=left | Disc.: Kitt Peak Obs. || 
|- id="2002 VF151" bgcolor=#fefefe
| 0 ||  || MBA-I || 18.3 || data-sort-value="0.65" | 650 m || multiple || 2002–2021 || 18 Jan 2021 || 59 || align=left | Disc.: Kitt Peak Obs. || 
|- id="2002 VJ151" bgcolor=#fefefe
| 0 ||  || MBA-I || 18.5 || data-sort-value="0.59" | 590 m || multiple || 2002–2020 || 21 Sep 2020 || 63 || align=left | Disc.: LPL/Spacewatch II || 
|- id="2002 VK151" bgcolor=#E9E9E9
| 0 ||  || MBA-M || 18.1 || data-sort-value="0.71" | 710 m || multiple || 2002–2019 || 19 Dec 2019 || 37 || align=left | Disc.: Kitt Peak Obs. || 
|- id="2002 VL151" bgcolor=#E9E9E9
| 1 ||  || MBA-M || 17.4 || 1.4 km || multiple || 2002–2019 || 25 Nov 2019 || 55 || align=left | Disc.: NEATAlt.: 2019 NS7 || 
|- id="2002 VM151" bgcolor=#fefefe
| 0 ||  || MBA-I || 18.7 || data-sort-value="0.54" | 540 m || multiple || 2002–2020 || 03 Jan 2020 || 34 || align=left | Disc.: Kitt Peak Obs. || 
|- id="2002 VN151" bgcolor=#E9E9E9
| 0 ||  || MBA-M || 17.4 || 1.8 km || multiple || 2002–2018 || 18 Feb 2018 || 34 || align=left | Disc.: Kitt Peak Obs.Alt.: 2010 HJ134 || 
|- id="2002 VO151" bgcolor=#fefefe
| 0 ||  || MBA-I || 18.2 || data-sort-value="0.68" | 680 m || multiple || 2002–2020 || 14 Nov 2020 || 94 || align=left | Disc.: LPL/Spacewatch II || 
|- id="2002 VP151" bgcolor=#E9E9E9
| 0 ||  || MBA-M || 18.04 || 1.0 km || multiple || 2002–2019 || 20 Dec 2019 || 77 || align=left | Disc.: La Palma Obs. || 
|- id="2002 VQ151" bgcolor=#E9E9E9
| 0 ||  || MBA-M || 17.2 || 1.5 km || multiple || 2002–2020 || 24 Jan 2020 || 87 || align=left | Disc.: Emerald Lane Obs. || 
|- id="2002 VR151" bgcolor=#d6d6d6
| 0 ||  || MBA-O || 16.92 || 2.3 km || multiple || 2002–2021 || 11 Jun 2021 || 104 || align=left | Disc.: LPL/Spacewatch II || 
|- id="2002 VS151" bgcolor=#d6d6d6
| 0 ||  || MBA-O || 16.1 || 3.4 km || multiple || 2002–2021 || 17 Jan 2021 || 77 || align=left | Disc.: La Palma Obs. || 
|- id="2002 VU151" bgcolor=#d6d6d6
| 0 ||  || MBA-O || 16.4 || 2.9 km || multiple || 2002–2021 || 24 Jan 2021 || 89 || align=left | Disc.: NEAT || 
|- id="2002 VV151" bgcolor=#E9E9E9
| 0 ||  || MBA-M || 18.45 || data-sort-value="0.86" | 860 m || multiple || 2002–2021 || 07 Feb 2021 || 85 || align=left | Disc.: LPL/Spacewatch II || 
|- id="2002 VW151" bgcolor=#fefefe
| 0 ||  || MBA-I || 18.27 || data-sort-value="0.66" | 660 m || multiple || 2002–2021 || 03 May 2021 || 170 || align=left | Disc.: LPL/Spacewatch II || 
|- id="2002 VX151" bgcolor=#E9E9E9
| 0 ||  || MBA-M || 17.9 || 1.1 km || multiple || 2002–2019 || 20 Dec 2019 || 73 || align=left | Disc.: LPL/Spacewatch II || 
|- id="2002 VY151" bgcolor=#d6d6d6
| 0 ||  || MBA-O || 16.4 || 2.9 km || multiple || 2002–2019 || 19 Dec 2019 || 65 || align=left | Disc.: La Palma Obs. || 
|- id="2002 VZ151" bgcolor=#d6d6d6
| 0 ||  || MBA-O || 15.6 || 4.2 km || multiple || 2002–2021 || 16 Jan 2021 || 119 || align=left | Disc.: NEATAlt.: 2010 HD81 || 
|- id="2002 VA152" bgcolor=#E9E9E9
| 0 ||  || MBA-M || 16.9 || 1.8 km || multiple || 2002–2020 || 20 Dec 2020 || 63 || align=left | Disc.: NEAT || 
|- id="2002 VB152" bgcolor=#E9E9E9
| 0 ||  || MBA-M || 17.94 || 1.1 km || multiple || 2002–2021 || 09 Apr 2021 || 66 || align=left | Disc.: Kitt Peak Obs. || 
|- id="2002 VC152" bgcolor=#E9E9E9
| 0 ||  || MBA-M || 17.7 || 1.2 km || multiple || 2002–2019 || 28 Nov 2019 || 51 || align=left | Disc.: Kitt Peak Obs. || 
|- id="2002 VD152" bgcolor=#E9E9E9
| 0 ||  || MBA-M || 17.59 || 1.3 km || multiple || 2002–2021 || 01 May 2021 || 100 || align=left | Disc.: NEAT || 
|- id="2002 VE152" bgcolor=#fefefe
| 0 ||  || MBA-I || 18.8 || data-sort-value="0.52" | 520 m || multiple || 2002–2019 || 02 May 2019 || 49 || align=left | Disc.: Kitt Peak Obs. || 
|- id="2002 VF152" bgcolor=#E9E9E9
| 0 ||  || MBA-M || 17.3 || 1.5 km || multiple || 2002–2020 || 28 Jan 2020 || 80 || align=left | Disc.: NEAT || 
|- id="2002 VG152" bgcolor=#d6d6d6
| 0 ||  || MBA-O || 16.9 || 2.3 km || multiple || 2002–2021 || 11 Jun 2021 || 121 || align=left | Disc.: Kitt Peak Obs.Alt.: 2010 BR68, 2010 NH134 || 
|- id="2002 VH152" bgcolor=#d6d6d6
| 0 ||  || MBA-O || 16.9 || 2.3 km || multiple || 2002–2018 || 03 Oct 2018 || 45 || align=left | Disc.: Kitt Peak Obs. || 
|- id="2002 VJ152" bgcolor=#fefefe
| 0 ||  || MBA-I || 18.5 || data-sort-value="0.59" | 590 m || multiple || 2002–2019 || 25 Jun 2019 || 40 || align=left | Disc.: Kitt Peak Obs. || 
|- id="2002 VK152" bgcolor=#fefefe
| 0 ||  || MBA-I || 18.5 || data-sort-value="0.59" | 590 m || multiple || 1995–2019 || 05 Nov 2019 || 48 || align=left | Disc.: LPL/Spacewatch II || 
|- id="2002 VL152" bgcolor=#fefefe
| 0 ||  || MBA-I || 18.31 || data-sort-value="0.65" | 650 m || multiple || 2002–2021 || 15 Apr 2021 || 54 || align=left | Disc.: NEAT || 
|- id="2002 VM152" bgcolor=#d6d6d6
| 0 ||  || MBA-O || 17.2 || 2.0 km || multiple || 2002–2020 || 21 Apr 2020 || 47 || align=left | Disc.: LPL/Spacewatch II || 
|- id="2002 VN152" bgcolor=#d6d6d6
| 0 ||  || MBA-O || 17.0 || 2.2 km || multiple || 2002–2019 || 02 Dec 2019 || 47 || align=left | Disc.: LPL/Spacewatch II || 
|- id="2002 VO152" bgcolor=#fefefe
| 0 ||  || MBA-I || 18.26 || data-sort-value="0.66" | 660 m || multiple || 2002–2021 || 07 Jul 2021 || 87 || align=left | Disc.: LPL/Spacewatch IIAlt.: 2010 EW9 || 
|- id="2002 VQ152" bgcolor=#E9E9E9
| 0 ||  || MBA-M || 18.1 || 1.0 km || multiple || 2002–2019 || 02 Nov 2019 || 43 || align=left | Disc.: Kitt Peak Obs. || 
|- id="2002 VR152" bgcolor=#fefefe
| 0 ||  || MBA-I || 17.4 || data-sort-value="0.98" | 980 m || multiple || 2002–2020 || 17 Nov 2020 || 82 || align=left | Disc.: Kitt Peak Obs. || 
|- id="2002 VS152" bgcolor=#d6d6d6
| 0 ||  || MBA-O || 16.78 || 2.5 km || multiple || 2002–2021 || 13 Apr 2021 || 59 || align=left | Disc.: Kitt Peak Obs. || 
|- id="2002 VT152" bgcolor=#d6d6d6
| 0 ||  || MBA-O || 16.5 || 2.8 km || multiple || 2002–2019 || 29 Oct 2019 || 40 || align=left | Disc.: Kitt Peak Obs. || 
|- id="2002 VV152" bgcolor=#fefefe
| 0 ||  || MBA-I || 18.9 || data-sort-value="0.49" | 490 m || multiple || 2002–2020 || 21 Jan 2020 || 46 || align=left | Disc.: Kitt Peak Obs. || 
|- id="2002 VW152" bgcolor=#E9E9E9
| 1 ||  || MBA-M || 18.3 || data-sort-value="0.92" | 920 m || multiple || 2002–2019 || 25 Nov 2019 || 38 || align=left | Disc.: Kitt Peak Obs. || 
|- id="2002 VX152" bgcolor=#fefefe
| 0 ||  || MBA-I || 18.38 || data-sort-value="0.63" | 630 m || multiple || 2002–2021 || 06 Apr 2021 || 60 || align=left | Disc.: NEAT || 
|- id="2002 VY152" bgcolor=#d6d6d6
| 0 ||  || MBA-O || 16.6 || 2.7 km || multiple || 2002–2021 || 16 Jan 2021 || 54 || align=left | Disc.: LPL/Spacewatch IIAlt.: 2010 AJ118 || 
|- id="2002 VZ152" bgcolor=#E9E9E9
| 0 ||  || MBA-M || 17.9 || 1.1 km || multiple || 2002–2018 || 18 Aug 2018 || 33 || align=left | Disc.: Kitt Peak Obs. || 
|- id="2002 VA153" bgcolor=#E9E9E9
| 0 ||  || MBA-M || 17.73 || 1.6 km || multiple || 2002–2021 || 30 Nov 2021 || 39 || align=left | Disc.: Kitt Peak Obs. || 
|- id="2002 VB153" bgcolor=#fefefe
| 0 ||  || MBA-I || 17.17 || 1.1 km || multiple || 2002–2021 || 06 Dec 2021 || 96 || align=left | Disc.: NEAT || 
|- id="2002 VD153" bgcolor=#E9E9E9
| 3 ||  || MBA-M || 19.6 || data-sort-value="0.36" | 360 m || multiple || 2002–2018 || 12 Nov 2018 || 27 || align=left | Disc.: Kitt Peak Obs. || 
|- id="2002 VE153" bgcolor=#C2FFFF
| 0 ||  || JT || 13.60 || 11 km || multiple || 2002–2021 || 04 Aug 2021 || 128 || align=left | Disc.: LPL/Spacewatch IITrojan camp (L5) || 
|- id="2002 VG153" bgcolor=#d6d6d6
| 0 ||  || MBA-O || 16.90 || 2.3 km || multiple || 2002–2021 || 13 May 2021 || 80 || align=left | Disc.: Kitt Peak Obs. || 
|- id="2002 VK153" bgcolor=#E9E9E9
| 0 ||  || MBA-M || 17.5 || 1.3 km || multiple || 2002–2019 || 21 Oct 2019 || 53 || align=left | Disc.: LPL/Spacewatch II || 
|- id="2002 VN153" bgcolor=#E9E9E9
| 0 ||  || MBA-M || 17.3 || 1.9 km || multiple || 2002–2020 || 23 Sep 2020 || 66 || align=left | Disc.: Kitt Peak Obs. || 
|- id="2002 VO153" bgcolor=#E9E9E9
| 0 ||  || MBA-M || 17.70 || 1.6 km || multiple || 2002–2020 || 17 Sep 2020 || 49 || align=left | Disc.: La Palma Obs. || 
|- id="2002 VP153" bgcolor=#d6d6d6
| 0 ||  || MBA-O || 17.6 || 1.7 km || multiple || 2002–2020 || 20 Apr 2020 || 30 || align=left | Disc.: Kitt Peak Obs. || 
|- id="2002 VQ153" bgcolor=#d6d6d6
| 0 ||  || MBA-O || 16.6 || 2.7 km || multiple || 2002–2021 || 12 Jan 2021 || 91 || align=left | Disc.: La Palma Obs. || 
|- id="2002 VR153" bgcolor=#E9E9E9
| 0 ||  || MBA-M || 18.23 || data-sort-value="0.95" | 950 m || multiple || 2002–2021 || 08 May 2021 || 47 || align=left | Disc.: Kitt Peak Obs. || 
|- id="2002 VS153" bgcolor=#fefefe
| 1 ||  || MBA-I || 18.5 || data-sort-value="0.59" | 590 m || multiple || 2002–2019 || 24 Aug 2019 || 47 || align=left | Disc.: Powell Obs. || 
|- id="2002 VT153" bgcolor=#d6d6d6
| 0 ||  || MBA-O || 16.9 || 2.3 km || multiple || 2002–2019 || 28 Dec 2019 || 42 || align=left | Disc.: LPL/Spacewatch II || 
|- id="2002 VU153" bgcolor=#d6d6d6
| 0 ||  || MBA-O || 17.0 || 2.2 km || multiple || 2002–2019 || 28 Nov 2019 || 30 || align=left | Disc.: Kitt Peak Obs. || 
|- id="2002 VV153" bgcolor=#E9E9E9
| 0 ||  || MBA-M || 18.4 || data-sort-value="0.88" | 880 m || multiple || 2002–2019 || 01 Nov 2019 || 64 || align=left | Disc.: LPL/Spacewatch II || 
|- id="2002 VW153" bgcolor=#d6d6d6
| 0 ||  || MBA-O || 16.7 || 2.5 km || multiple || 2002–2019 || 28 Oct 2019 || 61 || align=left | Disc.: Kitt Peak Obs. || 
|- id="2002 VX153" bgcolor=#d6d6d6
| 0 ||  || MBA-O || 16.99 || 2.2 km || multiple || 2002–2021 || 09 May 2021 || 73 || align=left | Disc.: Kitt Peak Obs. || 
|- id="2002 VY153" bgcolor=#C2FFFF
| 0 ||  || JT || 14.1 || 8.4 km || multiple || 2002–2020 || 24 Jun 2020 || 76 || align=left | Disc.: Kitt Peak Obs.Trojan camp (L5) || 
|- id="2002 VZ153" bgcolor=#d6d6d6
| 0 ||  || MBA-O || 16.7 || 2.5 km || multiple || 2002–2021 || 12 Jan 2021 || 77 || align=left | Disc.: George Obs. || 
|- id="2002 VA154" bgcolor=#E9E9E9
| 0 ||  || MBA-M || 17.6 || 1.3 km || multiple || 2002–2020 || 11 Dec 2020 || 63 || align=left | Disc.: La Palma Obs. || 
|- id="2002 VB154" bgcolor=#E9E9E9
| 0 ||  || MBA-M || 17.7 || 1.2 km || multiple || 2002–2019 || 24 Dec 2019 || 61 || align=left | Disc.: Kitt Peak Obs. || 
|- id="2002 VC154" bgcolor=#d6d6d6
| 0 ||  || MBA-O || 16.2 || 3.2 km || multiple || 2002–2020 || 22 Dec 2020 || 58 || align=left | Disc.: NEAT || 
|- id="2002 VD154" bgcolor=#d6d6d6
| 0 ||  || MBA-O || 17.36 || 1.9 km || multiple || 2002–2021 || 12 May 2021 || 75 || align=left | Disc.: LPL/Spacewatch II || 
|- id="2002 VE154" bgcolor=#fefefe
| 0 ||  || MBA-I || 18.7 || data-sort-value="0.54" | 540 m || multiple || 2002–2019 || 20 Oct 2019 || 43 || align=left | Disc.: Kitt Peak Obs. || 
|- id="2002 VG154" bgcolor=#d6d6d6
| 0 ||  || MBA-O || 16.9 || 2.3 km || multiple || 2002–2021 || 18 Jan 2021 || 45 || align=left | Disc.: Kitt Peak Obs. || 
|- id="2002 VH154" bgcolor=#E9E9E9
| 0 ||  || MBA-M || 17.9 || 1.5 km || multiple || 2002–2020 || 23 Sep 2020 || 83 || align=left | Disc.: Kitt Peak Obs. || 
|- id="2002 VJ154" bgcolor=#d6d6d6
| 0 ||  || MBA-O || 17.1 || 2.1 km || multiple || 2002–2019 || 24 Dec 2019 || 37 || align=left | Disc.: La Palma Obs. || 
|- id="2002 VK154" bgcolor=#fefefe
| 0 ||  || MBA-I || 18.3 || data-sort-value="0.65" | 650 m || multiple || 2002–2020 || 18 Oct 2020 || 135 || align=left | Disc.: Kitt Peak Obs. || 
|- id="2002 VL154" bgcolor=#E9E9E9
| 0 ||  || MBA-M || 18.4 || data-sort-value="0.88" | 880 m || multiple || 2002–2019 || 19 Nov 2019 || 35 || align=left | Disc.: Kitt Peak Obs. || 
|- id="2002 VM154" bgcolor=#E9E9E9
| 0 ||  || MBA-M || 17.57 || 1.3 km || multiple || 2002–2021 || 10 Apr 2021 || 85 || align=left | Disc.: NEATAdded on 22 July 2020 || 
|- id="2002 VN154" bgcolor=#E9E9E9
| 0 ||  || MBA-M || 18.3 || 1.2 km || multiple || 2002–2019 || 08 Aug 2019 || 27 || align=left | Disc.: Kitt Peak Obs.Added on 19 October 2020 || 
|- id="2002 VO154" bgcolor=#fefefe
| 1 ||  || MBA-I || 19.57 || data-sort-value="0.36" | 360 m || multiple || 2002–2020 || 17 Dec 2020 || 47 || align=left | Disc.: Kitt Peak Obs.Added on 17 January 2021 || 
|- id="2002 VS154" bgcolor=#E9E9E9
| 2 ||  || MBA-M || 18.2 || 1.3 km || multiple || 2002–2020 || 11 Dec 2020 || 29 || align=left | Disc.: Kitt Peak Obs.Added on 9 March 2021 || 
|- id="2002 VT154" bgcolor=#E9E9E9
| 0 ||  || MBA-M || 17.5 || data-sort-value="0.94" | 940 m || multiple || 2000–2021 || 11 Jun 2021 || 90 || align=left | Disc.: Kitt Peak Obs.Added on 11 May 2021 || 
|}
back to top

References 
 

Lists of unnumbered minor planets